= Cassa di Risparmio =

Cassa di Risparmio is the Italian word for savings bank, and may refer to:

== Current banks ==
- Cassa di Risparmio di Asti, also known as Banca di Asti, an Italian bank
- Cassa di Risparmio di Biella e Vercelli, also known as BiverBanca, a subsidiary of Cassa di Risparmio di Asti
- Cassa di Risparmio di Bolzano, Italian name of the savings bank of Bolzano, South Tyrol (Südtiroler Sparkasse – Cassa di Risparmio di Bolzano)
- Cassa di Risparmio di Bra, a subsidiary of BPER Banca
- Cassa di Risparmio di Cento, an Italian bank
- Cassa di Risparmio di Fermo, an Italian bank
- Cassa di Risparmio di Fossano, an Italian bank
- Cassa di Risparmio di Genova e Imperia, known as Banca Carige, an Italian bank
- Cassa di Risparmio di Imola, a brand of Banco Popolare
- Cassa di Risparmio di Lucca Pisa Livorno, a brand of Banco Popolare
- Cassa di Risparmio di Orvieto, a subsidiary of Banca Popolare di Bari
- Cassa di Risparmio di Parma e Piacenza, known as Cariparma or Crédit Agricole Italia, a subsidiary of Crédit Agricole
- Cassa di Risparmio di Ravenna, an Italian bank
- Cassa di Risparmio di Saluzzo, an Italian bank
- Cassa di Risparmio della Repubblica di San Marino, Sammarinese bank
- Cassa di Risparmio di Savigliano, known as Banca Cassa di Risparmio di Savigliano, an Italian bank
- Cassa di Risparmio della Spezia, known as Carispezia, a subsidiary of Crédit Agricole Italia
- Cassa di Risparmio di Volterra, an Italian bank

== Defunct banks ==
- Cassa di Risparmio di Alessandria, a defunct subsidiary of Banca Popolare di Milano
- Cassa di Risparmio di Ancona (?–1989), a predecessor of Cassa di Risparmio di Verona, Vicenza, Belluno e Ancona
- Cassa di Risparmio di Ascoli Piceno, a defunct subsidiary of Intesa Sanpaolo
- Cassa di Risparmio di Biella, predecessor of Cassa di Risparmio di Biella e Vercelli
- Cassa di Risparmio in Bologna, known as Carisbo, a defunct subsidiary of Intesa Sanpaolo
- Cassa di Risparmio di Calabria e Lucania, predecessor of Banca Carime
- Cassa di Risparmio di Carpi, a defunct subsidiary of UniCredit
- Cassa di Risparmio di Carrara, a defunct subsidiary of Banca Carige
- Cassa di Risparmio di Cesena, a subsidiary of Crédit Agricole Italia
- Cassa di Risparmio di Civitavecchia, a defunct subsidiary of Intesa Sanpaolo
- Cassa di Risparmio di Cuneo, predecessor of UBI Banca
- Cassa di Risparmio di Fabriano e Cupramontana, a defunct subsidiary of Veneto Banca
- Cassa di Risparmio di Fano, a defunct subsidiary of Credito Valtellinese
- Cassa di Risparmio di Firenze, known as Banca CR Firenze, a defunct subsidiary of Intesa Sanpaolo
- Cassa di Risparmio di Foligno, a defunct subsidiary of Intesa Sanpaolo
- Cassa dei Risparmi di Forlì e della Romagna, a defunct subsidiary of Intesa Sanpaolo
- Cassa di Risparmio del Friuli Venezia Giulia, a defunct subsidiary of Intesa Sanpaolo
- Cassa di Risparmio di Jesi, a predecessor of Banca delle Marche
- Cassa di Risparmi di Livorno, a defunct subsidiary of Banco Popolare
- Cassa di Risparmio di Loreto, a defunct subsidiary of UBI Banca
- Cassa di Risparmio della Marca Trivigiana, also known as Cassamarca, a defunct subsidiary of UniCredit
- Cassa di Risparmio di Padova e Rovigo, former name of Cassa di Risparmio del Veneto, a defunct subsidiary of Intesa Sanpaolo
- Cassa di Risparmio di Perugia, former name of Banca dell'Umbria, a defunct subsidiary of UniCredit
- Cassa di Risparmio di Pescara e Loreto Aprutino, known as Banca Caripe, a defunct subsidiary of Banca Popolare di Bari
- Cassa di Risparmio di Piacenza e Vigevano, which merged with Cariparma
- Cassa di Risparmio di Pisa, a defunct subsidiary of Banco Popolare
- Cassa di Risparmio di Pistoia e della Lucchesia, also known as C.R. di Pistoia e Pescia, a defunct subsidiary of Intesa Sanpaolo
- Cassa di Risparmio di Prato, a defunct subsidiary of Banca Popolare di Vicenza
- Cassa di Risparmio della Provincia dell'Aquila, a defunct subsidiary of Banca Popolare dell'Emilia Romagna
- Cassa di Risparmio della Provincia di Teramo, known as Banca Tercas, a defunct subsidiary of Banca Popolare di Bari
- Cassa di Risparmio della Provincia di Viterbo, a defunct subsidiary of Intesa Sanpaolo
- Cassa di Risparmio delle Provincie Lombarde, predecessor of Intesa Sanpaolo
- Cassa di Risparmio di Reggio Emilia, predecessor of Bipop Carire
- Cassa di Risparmio di Rimini, known as Banca Carim, a subsidiary of Crédit Agricole Italia
- Cassa di Risparmio di Roma, predecessor of Banca di Roma
- Cassa di Risparmio di San Miniato, a subsidiary of Crédit Agricole Italia
- Cassa di Risparmio di Torino, predecessor of UniCredit
- Cassa di Risparmio di Tortona, a defunct subsidiary of UBI Banca
- Cassa di Risparmio di Trieste, a defunct subsidiary of UniCredit
- Casse di Risparmio dell'Umbria, a defunct subsidiary of Intesa Sanpaolo
- Cassa di Risparmio di Venezia, a defunct subsidiary of Intesa Sanpaolo
- Cassa di Risparmio di Vercelli, predecessor of Cassa di Risparmio di Biella e Vercelli
- Cassa di Risparmio di Verona, Vicenza, Belluno e Ancona, predecessor of UniCredit
- Cassa di Risparmio di Vignola, known as Banca CRV, a defunct subsidiary of Banca Popolare dell'Emilia Romagna
- Banca del Monte e Cassa di Risparmio Faenza, predecessor of Banca di Romagna
- Sicilcassa, also known as Cassa Centrale di Risparmio Vittorio Emanuele per le Province Siciliane, a defunct subsidiary of Banco di Sicilia, (now part of UniCredit)
- Nuova Cassa di Risparmio di Chieti, successor of Cassa di Risparmio della Provincia di Chieti, a defunct subsidiary of UBI Banca
- Nuova Cassa di Risparmio di Ferrara, a subsidiary of BPER Banca

== Banking foundations ==
Fondazione Cassa di Risparmio were the former owners of the savings banks, due to a legislation in 1990

- Ente Cassa di Risparmio di Firenze, the original shareholder of Banca CR Firenze, now a minority shareholder of Intesa Sanpaolo
- Fondazione Carige, the original shareholder of Cassa di Risparmio di Genova e Imperia (Carige)
- Fondazione Cariparo, the original shareholder of Cassa di Risparmio di Padova e Rovigo (Cariparo), now a minority shareholder of Intesa Sanpaolo
- Fondazione Cariplo, the original shareholder of Cassa di Risparmio delle Provincie Lombarde (Cariplo), now a minority shareholder of Intesa Sanpaolo
- Fondazione Carisbo, the original shareholder of Cassa di Risparmio in Bologna (Carisbo), now a minority shareholder of Intesa Sanpaolo
- Fondazione Carispaq, the original shareholder of Cassa di Risparmio della Provincia dell'Aquila (Carispaq), now a minority shareholder of Banca Popolare dell'Emilia Romagna
- Fondazione Cariverona, the original shareholder of Cassa di Risparmio di Verona, Vicenza, Belluno e Ancona (Cariverona), now a minority shareholder of UniCredit
- Fondazione CRT, the original shareholder of Cassa di Risparmio di Torino (Banca CRT), now a minority shareholder of UniCredit
- Fondazione Manodori, the original shareholder of Cassa di Risparmio di Reggio Emilia (Carire), now a minority shareholder of UniCredit
- Fondazione Pisa, the original shareholder of Cassa di Risparmio di Pisa
- Fondazione Roma, the original shareholder of Cassa di Risparmio di Roma
- Fondazione di Piacenza e Vigevano, the original shareholder of Cassa di Risparmio di Piacenza e Vigevano

== Arts ==
- Art collection of Fondazione Cariplo (Cassa di Risparmio delle Provincie Lombarde)
- Art collection of Fondazione Cassa di Risparmio di Cesena
- Art collection of Fondazione Cassa di Risparmio di Fano
- Art collection of Fondazione Cassa di Risparmio di Lucca
- Art collection of Fondazione Cassa di Risparmio di Perugia
- Art collection of Fondazione Manodori (Fondazione Cassa di Risparmio di Reggio Emilia – Pietro Manodori)
- Prize Cento, a literature prize

== Buildings ==
- Palazzo di Residenza della Cassa di Risparmio in Bologna

== Sports ==
- Alessandria Challenger, known as Trofeo Cassa di Risparmio Alessandria, tennis tournament sponsored by Cassa di Risparmio Alessandria
- Bologna Outdoor, known as Grand Prix Citta di Bologna Cassa di Risparmio, tennis tournament sponsored by Cassa di Risparmio si Bologna (Carisbo)
- San Benedetto Tennis Cup, known as Carisap Tennis Cup, tennis tournament sponsored by Cassa di Risparmio di Ascoli (Carisap)

== See also ==
- Associazione di Fondazioni e di Casse di Risparmio S.p.A.
