= Associazione di Fondazioni e di Casse di Risparmio S.p.A. =

Italian banking association

Associazione di Fondazioni e di Casse di Risparmio Spa (Association of Foundations and Savings Banks JSCs) is an Italian banking association. The members were the savings banks (Italian: casse di risparmio or singular cassa di risparmio) of Italy, or the foundation that originate from the reform trigger by Legge Amato.

== History ==
The association was found in 1912 as Associazione fra le Casse di Risparmio Italiane (ACRI) (Association of Italian Savings Banks). Due to Legge Amato, the savings banks became banking foundations and their respective "companies by shares" (Italian: Società per azioni). After 25 years of merger and acquisitions, only 24 member banks (including banks with mount of piety origins) survived, with only eight of them were owned by their original banking foundations, plus Banca Carige that went fully publicly owned. The rest of the savings bank that survived from their establishments until 1991, became part of Intesa Sanpaolo, UniCredit, Banco BPM, UBI Banca, BPER Banca, Banca Popolare di Bari, Credito Valtellinese, Banca Carige, Banca di Asti, Crédit Agricole Italia and other banking group. Moreover, two more savings banks, Cariparma and Biverbanca were not members of ACRI.

The surviving banks were either independent banks (such as Banca Carige, Cassa di Risparmio di Ravenna, Südtiroler Sparkasse, etc.), subsidiaries (e.g. Banca CR Firenze and Carisbo) or minority owned by major banking group (e.g. Banca di Asti and Banca Cassa di Risparmio di Savigliano).

ACRI members (the foundations) also owned 18.4% stake collectively in Cassa Depositi e Prestiti. The members also involved in the investment fund F2i First and Second Fund.

In 2015 85 out of 86 member foundations of ACRI (except Fondazione Cassa di Risparmio di Fossano) had signed a memorandum of understanding with Ministry of Economy and Finance for the new regulation on the assets of the foundations.

According to ACRI, the collective shareholders' equity of 87 out of 88 foundations were €41,243,344,914. (including non-member Roma and Pisa but data from Carige was missing) However, the value of the assets were based on the historic price, such as the price of the shares of the bank.

In 2016 the foundations were invited to invest back to banking sector by joining the private equity fund Atlante that aiming to recapitalize the weak bank and purchase the securitizated non-performing loan.

== Members ==
=== Foundations ===
As of 29 September 2017

- Compagnia di San Paolo
- Ente Cassa di Risparmio di Firenze
- Fondazione Agostino De Mari Cassa di Risparmio di Savona
- Fondazione Banca del Monte di Foggia
- Fondazione Banca del Monte di Lombardia
- Fondazione Banca del Monte di Lucca
- Fondazione Banca del Monte di Rovigo
- Fondazione Banca del Monte e Cassa di Risparmio Faenza
- Fondazione Banca Nazionale delle Comunicazioni
- Fondazione Banco di Napoli
- Fondazione Cassa dei Risparmi di Forlì
- Fondazione Cassa di Risparmio della Provincia dell'Aquila
- Fondazione Cassa di Risparmio della Provincia di Chieti
- Fondazione Cassa di Risparmio della Provincia di Macerata
- Fondazione Cassa di Risparmio della Provincia di Viterbo
- Fondazione Cassa di Risparmio delle Provincie Lombarde
- Fondazione Cassa di Risparmio della Spezia
- Fondazione Cassa di Risparmio di Alessandria
- Fondazione Cassa di Risparmio di Ascoli Piceno
- Fondazione Cassa di Risparmio di Asti
- Fondazione Cassa di Risparmio di Biella
- Fondazione Cassa di Risparmio di Bolzano
- Fondazione Cassa di Risparmio di Bra
- Fondazione Cassa di Risparmio di Calabria e di Lucania
- Fondazione Cassa di Risparmio di Carpi
- Fondazione Cassa di Risparmio di Carrara
- Fondazione Cassa di Risparmio di Cento
- Fondazione Cassa di Risparmio di Cesena
- Fondazione Cassa di Risparmio di Città di Castello
- Fondazione Cassa di Risparmio di Civitavecchia
- Fondazione Cassa di Risparmio di Cuneo
- Fondazione Cassa di Risparmio di Fabriano e Cupramontana
- Fondazione Cassa di Risparmio di Fano
- Fondazione Cassa di Risparmio di Fermo
- Fondazione Cassa di Risparmio di Ferrara
- Fondazione Cassa di Risparmio di Foligno
- Fondazione Cassa di Risparmio di Fossano
- Fondazione Cassa di Risparmio di Genova e Imperia
- Fondazione Cassa di Risparmio di Gorizia
- Fondazione Cassa di Risparmio di Imola
- Fondazione Cassa di Risparmio di Jesi
- Fondazione Cassa di Risparmio di Loreto
- Fondazione Cassa di Risparmio di Lucca
- Fondazione Cassa di Risparmio di Mirandola
- Fondazione Cassa di Risparmio di Modena
- Fondazione Cassa di Risparmio di Orvieto
- Fondazione Cassa di Risparmio di Padova e Rovigo
- Fondazione Cassa di Risparmio di Parma e Monte Busseto
- Fondazione Cassa di Risparmio di Perugia
- Fondazione Cassa di Risparmio di Pesaro
- Fondazione Cassa di Risparmio di Pistoia e Pescia
- Fondazione Cassa di Risparmio di Prato
- Fondazione Cassa di Risparmio di Ravenna
- Fondazione Cassa di Risparmio di Reggio Emilia – Pietro Manodori
- Fondazione Cassa di Risparmio di Rimini
- Fondazione Cassa di Risparmio di Saluzzo
- Fondazione Cassa di Risparmio di San Miniato
- Fondazione Cassa di Risparmio di Savigliano
- Fondazione Cassa di Risparmio di Spoleto
- Fondazione Cassa di Risparmio di Terni e Narni
- Fondazione Cassa di Risparmio di Torino
- Fondazione Cassa di Risparmio di Tortona
- Fondazione Cassa di Risparmio di Trento e Rovereto
- Fondazione Cassa di Risparmio di Trieste
- Fondazione Cassa di Risparmio di Udine e Pordenone
- Fondazione Cassa di Risparmio di Vercelli
- Fondazione Cassa di Risparmio di Verona, Vicenza, Belluno e Ancona
- Fondazione Cassa di Risparmio di Vignola
- Fondazione Cassa di Risparmio di Volterra
- Fondazione Cassa di Risparmio e Banca del Monte di Lugo
- Fondazione Cassa di Risparmio in Bologna
- Fondazione Cassa di Risparmio Salernitana
- Fondazione Cassamarca
- Fondazione del Monte di Bologna e Ravenna
- Fondazione di Piacenza e Vigevano
- Fondazione di Sardegna
- Fondazione di Venezia
- Fondazione Livorno
- Fondazione Monte dei Paschi di Siena
- Fondazione Monte di Parma
- Fondazione Monte di Pietà di Vicenza
- Fondazione Pescarabruzzo
- Fondazione Puglia
- Fondazione Sicilia
- Fondazione Tercas
- Fondazione Varrone Cassa di Risparmio di Rieti

=== Banks ===
- Cassa di Risparmio di Asti (Banca di Asti)
- Banca Carige
- Banca Carim, subsidiary of Crédit Agricole Italia
- Banca Cassa di Risparmio di Savigliano
- Banca CR Firenze, subsidiary of Intesa Sanpaolo
- Banca del Monte di Lucca, subsidiary of Banca Carige
- Banco di Sardegna, subsidiary of BPER Banca
- Cassa dei Risparmi di Forlì e della Romagna, subsidiary of Intesa Sanpaolo
- Cassa di Risparmio del Friuli Venezia Giulia, subsidiary of Intesa Sanpaolo
- Cassa di Risparmio del Veneto, subsidiary of Intesa Sanpaolo
- Cassa di Risparmio della Spezia, subsidiary of Crédit Agricole Italia
- Cassa di Risparmio di Bra, subsidiary of BPER Banca
- Cassa di Risparmio di Cento
- Cassa di Risparmio di Cesena, subsidiary of Crédit Agricole Italia
- Cassa di Risparmio di Fermo
- Cassa di Risparmio di Fossano
- Cassa di Risparmio di Orvieto, subsidiary of Banca Popolare di Bari
- Cassa di Risparmio di Pistoia e della Lucchesia, subsidiary of Intesa Sanpaolo
- Cassa di Risparmio di Ravenna
- Cassa di Risparmio di Saluzzo, subsidiary of BPER Banca
- Cassa di Risparmio di San Miniato, subsidiary of Crédit Agricole Italia
- Cassa di Risparmio di Volterra
- Cassa di Risparmio in Bologna, subsidiary of Intesa Sanpaolo
- Südtiroler Sparkasse – Cassa di Risparmio di Bolzano

=== former members ===
- Fondazione Pisa
- Fondazione Roma
- Banca dell'Adriatico (merged into Intesa Sanpaolo)
- Cassa di Risparmio di Loreto (merged into UBI Banca)
- Casse di Risparmio dell'Umbria (merged into Intesa Sanpaolo)
- Nuova Banca delle Marche (merged into UBI Banca)
- Nuova Cassa di Risparmio di Chieti (merged into UBI Banca)
- Nuova Cassa di Risparmio di Ferrara (merged into BPER Banca)
