= Savings bank =

Financial institution focused on savings deposits

A savings bank is a financial institution that is not run on a profit-maximizing basis, and whose original or primary purpose is collecting deposits on savings accounts that are invested on a low-risk basis and receive interest. Savings banks have mostly existed as a separate category in Europe.

Savings banks originated in late-18th century Europe as a development of the Enlightenment, and became a Europe-wide phenomenon in the first half of the 19th century. The trajectories of savings bank systems then diverged across European nations, variously leading to the formation of integrated banking groups, cohesive national networks, conversion into cooperative banking or commercial banking entities, and/or piecemeal consolidation with other credit institutions. In most countries, the surviving savings banks have private-sector status and no longer operate under a distinctive legislative framework; significant exceptions include Germany and Luxembourg, where savings banks are public-sector entities.

== Naming ==
In many European languages, savings banks are referred to by a word that differentiates them from banks (French: caisse, German: Kasse, Italian: cassa, Russian: касса, Spanish: caja) and denotes their more restricted scope of activity, sometimes translated as "fund". That word has no direct equivalent in English; its etymology is identical with that of cash and it originally referred to a cash box, then a cash register.

== Overview ==
The origin of savings banks lies in liberal and philanthropic aspirations that motivated their promoters to create non-profit establishments aimed at promoting a culture of thrift and financial prudence among the lower classes, and using savings and the logic of compound interest as an incentive to think beyond short-term living horizons. In France, savings banks projects started to emerge in the 1750s and multiplied during the French Revolution but with no lasting success. Liberal luminaries including Adam Smith, Thomas Robert Malthus and Jean-Baptiste Say took interest in the economic and social role of savings.

The oldest lasting savings bank is widely recognized to have been the Ersparungsclasse der Allgemeinen Versorgungsanstalt established in Hamburg in 1778, followed by other endeavors in Germany and Switzerland in the late 18th century. Savings banks mushroomed in the early 19th century, with landmark establishments in Göttingen (1801, first municipal savings bank), Ruthwell, Scotland (1810, first in the United Kingdom), Boston (1816, first in the United States), Paris (1818, first in France), and Vienna (1819, first in the Austrian Empire). Even so, origin stories of the savings bank concept were long disputed. In 1914, the New Student's Reference Work said of the origins of savings banks:

France claims the credit of being the mother of savings banks, basing this claim on a savings bank said to have been established in 1765 in the town of Brumath, but it is of record that the savings bank idea was suggested in England as early as 1697. There was a savings bank in Hamburg, Germany, in 1778 and in Berne, Switzerland, in 1787. The first English savings bank was established in 1799, and postal savings banks were started in England in 1861.

The original function of savings banks to service consumers was limited to savings, not borrowing, a foundational difference with cooperative banking which started developing a bit later during the 19th century. Savings banks were typically heavily regulated and supervised by local or national governments, and restricted to invest only in government debt or other instruments deemed of low financial risk. Over time, however, these distinctions have tended to erode, and over the 20th century the regulatory framework and business model of savings banks has largely converged with those of commercial banks, albeit with significant variations across jurisdictions.

Starting in 1861 with the establishment of the British Post Office Savings Bank, savings banks were increasingly subject to competition from postal savings systems which similarly collected retail savings and invested them in safe government securities, albeit with variations across countries; some of the postal banks have themselves been called "savings banks", e.g. the Rijkspostspaarbank in the Netherlands (est. 1881), the Caisse Nationale d'Épargne in France (est. 1882), the Austrian Postsparkasse and Hungarian Postal Savings Bank in Austria-Hungary (est. 1882 and 1886 respectively), the People's Own Savings Bank in Zimbabwe (est. 1904, renamed in 1999), the Government Savings Bank in Thailand (est. 1913), the Caisse d'Épargne de Madagascar (est. 1918), and the National Savings Bank in Sri Lanka (est. 1971), and the Postal Savings Bank of China (est. 2007).

After a long period of relative stability, including through two world wars and the European banking crisis of 1931 during which they were comparatively less affected than commercial banks, the savings banks came under increasing competitive pressure during the interest rate turmoil of the 1970s and underwent significant transformation and restructuring in many jurisdictions during the last quarter of the 20th century. By the early 21st century, savings banks were most significant in Germany and Spain, and to a lesser extent in Austria.

In Communist banking systems during the 20th century, monopolistic national retail banking networks were often labeled as savings banks. The label survives in the names of several significant Central and Eastern European commercial banks such as DSK Bank in Bulgaria, Česká spořitelna in Czechia, OTP Bank in Hungary, PKO Bank Polski in Poland, Sberbank in Russia, Slovenská sporiteľňa in Slovakia, and Oschadbank in Ukraine. Other non-European banks (other than postal savings systems or their successors) similarly named include the Botswana Savings Bank and Savings and Social Development Bank in Sudan.

== By country ==
By chronological order of inception (not including postal savings systems):

- Germany: while the Ersparungskasse der Allgemeinen Versorgungsanstalt, est. 1778 in Hamburg, was a philanthropic endeavor, the dominant model for German savings banks has been sponsorship by local government, starting in Göttingen in 1801. In the early 20th century, savings banks created regional clearing entities, later known as Landesbanks, soon followed by the national Deutsche Girozentrale (est. 1918). The German savings banks sector is currently operating as a group with some centralized functions but decentralized organization, the Sparkassen-Finanzgruppe which relies on a group-wide institutional protection scheme.
- Switzerland: an early savings bank (German: Dienstenkasse) was established in Bern in 1787. The oldest one still extant is Sparkasse Schwyz (est. 1812). As of 2022, there were 59 Swiss regional and savings banks forming a decentralized network.
- United Kingdom: the Ruthwell Savings Bank (est. 1810) is often referred to as the first British savings bank, with competing claims about the Tottenham Female Benefit Club and Children's Bank (est. 1798 by philanthropist Priscilla Wakefield) and the Edinburgh Bank for Savings (est. 1814). In the 1970s and 1980s, surviving British savings banks consolidated into the Trustee Savings Bank, which merged with Lloyds Bank in 1995, was again spun off as TSB Bank in 2013, and was acquired by Spain's Banco Sabadell in 2015.
- Denmark: Holsteinsborg Saving Bank was established in 1810 in Skælskør. The Danish savings banks established a common national entity, the Fællesbanken for Danmarks Sparekasser, in 1949. Their number declined from over 500 in the 1930s to a bit above 100 by the late 1980s. In 1986-1991, Fællesbanken was dismantled and its components acquired respectively by Hafnia Insurance, Sydbank and Sparekassen Bikuben, the latter a major savings bank that was eventually merged into Danske Bank in 2000. The other major savings bank, Sparekassen SDS, merged in 1990 into what in 2000 became Nordea. The remaining savings banks in 1993 joined other smaller Danish commercial and cooperative banks to form a single association of Local Banks, Savings Banks and Cooperative Banks in Denmark, or Lokale Pengeinstitutter.
- Ireland: the first Irish trustee savings bank was founded in Waterford in 1816. By 1992, the trustee savings banks of Waterford and others in Cork, Dublin, Monaghan and Limerick had consolidated into TSB Bank, which was acquired in 2001 by Irish Life and Permanent and rebranded Permanent TSB.
- United States: mutual savings banks started with the Provident Institution for Savings in the Town of Boston (est. 1816), and were heavily concentrated in the Northeastern United States. They were decimated at the start of the savings and loan crisis in the early 1980s, and more mutual savings banks failed later in the 1980s and 1990s while other converted to joint-stock status. As of 2024, the oldest surviving mutual savings bank is Liberty Bank, established 1825 as Middletown Savings Bank. Federal savings banks are savings banks chartered at the federal level.
- Netherlands: the first Dutch savings bank (Dutch: Spaarbank) was established in 1817 in Workum; 1848 saw the creation of the Amsterdam Municipal Savings Bank. In 1907, the savings banks started to operate as a national network (Dutch: Spaarbankbond). In 1979-1983 the largest Dutch savings banks merged to form VSB Group which in the 1990s became a founding component of Fortis Group, itself dismantled in 2008 with the Dutch operations absorbed into ABN AMRO. Other savings banks merged into SNS Bank (for Dutch: Samenwerkende Nederlandse Spaarbanken, lit. 'Dutch savings banks working together'), later nationalized and renamed De Volksbank in 2017.
- France: following the Caisse d'Épargne de Paris (est. 1818), non-profit private-sector savings banks were created in numerous French towns and cities, and started developing a national organization of their own in the 1980s and 1990s. By legislation of 1999, the Groupe Caisse d'Épargne was converted into a cooperative banking group, which in 2009 merged with another cooperative group, Groupe Banque Populaire, to form Groupe BPCE.
- Austria: following the 1819 establishment of Erste Bank in Vienna, Austrian savings banks have developed first as philanthropic associations and later as local government-sponsored entities. The 1980s and 1990s saw multiple rounds of reform and the departure from the network of the largest savings bank, Vienna's Zentralsparkasse, which eventually became part of UniCredit. As a result of these changes, the Sparkassengruppe Österreich operates largely as a single commercial banking group (and is supervised as such under European Banking Supervision), with Erste Group Bank as its central entity.
- Slovenia: the Carniolan Savings Bank was established in 1820 (originally as Laibacher Sparkasse) and remained the only financial institution in what is now Slovenia until the 1860s. More municipal savings banks were subsequently established, including the Ljubljana Municipal Savings Bank in 1889.
- Sweden: the first Swedish savings bank was established in 1820 in Gothenburg. During the Sweden financial crisis 1990–1994, a number of them merged in 1992 to form a commercial banking group that has been branded Swedbank since 2006. Dozens of other savings banks survive, such as Westra Wermlands Sparbank in Värmland County (est. 1856).
- Italy: starting with Cassa di Risparmio di Venezia (est. 1822), a number of savings banks (Italian: Cassa di Risparmio) were established in the Italian parts of the Austrian Empire, followed by establishments in other Italian polities and after the unification of Italy. Italian savings banks never coalesced in a national network or group. In 1990, the legislation known as legge Amato led to their conversion into joint-stock companies, with independent banking foundations as shareholders. This triggered significant consolidation in the 1990s and 2000s into larger commercial banking groups. For example, the savings banks of Rimini (est. 1840), La Spezia (1842), Parma (1859), and Piacenza (1860) have become part of Crédit Agricole Italia; those of Venice and Padua (1822), Milan (1823), Florence (1829), Prato (1830), Gorizia and Pistoia (1831), Spoleto (1836), Bologna (1837), Forlì (1839), Ascoli Piceno (1842), Civitavecchia (1847), Cuneo and Viterbo (1855), Foligno (1857), Calabria (1861), and Apulia (1949) have become part of Intesa Sanpaolo; those of Pisa (1834), Lucca (1835), Livorno (1836), and Alessandria (1838), have become part of Banco BPM; those of Ferrara (1838), Genoa (1846), and L'Aquila (1859) have become part of BPER Banca; and those of Verona (1825), Turin (1827), Rome (1836), Trieste (1842), Modena (1846), Reggio Emilia (1852), Sicily (1861), Treviso (1907), and Perugia (1908) have become part of UniCredit. As of early 2024, a few savings banks still exist as independent entities in Asti, Bolzano, Cento, Fermo, Fossano, Ravenna, Savigliano, and Volterra.
- Norway: the savings banks in Norway started with the establishment of that of Christiania in 1822. Still run decentrally, they have coalesced into two national networks, SpareBank 1 (est. 1996) and Eika Gruppen (est. 1997). All savings banks are members of the Norwegian Savings Banks Association.
- Finland: Turun Säästöpankki-Åbo Sparbank (lit. 'Turku Savings Bank') was established in 1822 in Turku. The number of Finnish savings banks reached more than four hundred in the mid-20th century, but has decreased since then to only 16. Of these, 15 participate in the Savings Banks Group while Oma Säästöpankki (based in Seinäjoki) is run independently.
- Czech Republic: the Česká spořitelna (German: Böhmische Sparkasse) was established in 1825 under the savings bank framework of the Austrian Empire. The savings banks in Czechoslovakia were consolidated in 1967 into a single State Savings Bank, then split in 1969 into a Czech and a Slovak components. In the post-Communist transition, Česká spořitelna was privatized and purchased in 2000 by Erste Group.
- Spain: the cajas de ahorros developed from 1835 legislation that emulated the French template. The 2008–2014 Spanish financial crisis triggered massive restructuring and consolidation, by which many savings banks were liquidated, purchased by commercial banks, or consolidated into four savings banks groups: CaixaBank, IberCaja, Kutxabank, and Unicaja.
- Hungary: the First National Savings Bank of Pest established in 1839-1840, was converted in 1844 into a joint-stock company. From then, Hungarian entities named "savings bank" were essentially indistinguishable from commercial banks. In 1949, the Communist authorities established the National Savings Bank (Hungarian: Országos Takarék Pénztár), later known as OTP Bank.
- Russia: in 1842, the Imperial government established savings banks in Saint Petersburg and Moscow. Like all Russian banks, savings banks disappeared under war communism in the first few years of the Russian Revolution. They were re-established in 1922-1923 as the State Labor Savings Banks System of the USSR. In 1991, the Russian network of the Soviet Savings Banks System was reorganized as Sberbank.
- Slovakia: the Pressburger Spar-Casse was established in 1842 in today's Bratislava, followed by other savings bank foundations in what is now Slovakia throughout the 1840s. Today's Slovenská sporiteľňa, like its Czech equivalent, results from the 1969 division of the State Savings Bank of Czechoslovakia. It was also purchased by Erste Group in 2001.
- Croatia: as in Hungary (with which Croatia was tied politically until World War I), "savings banks" were largely undistinguishable from commercial banks until the general destruction of the Croatian banking sector following World War II. These included the First Croatian Savings Bank (est. 1846) and City Savings Bank of Zagreb (est. 1913).
- Belgium: the Caisse Générale d'Épargne et de Retraite was created in two stages in 1850 and 1865 as a national savings institution. In the 1990s it was privatized and became part of Fortis Group, since 2008 itself part of BNP Paribas.
- New Zealand: The first trustee savings bank was the New Plymouth Savings Bank (est. 1850), later branded TSB. Savings banks as a legal category disappeared in 1987, being replaced with so-called registered banks.
- Luxembourg: the Caisse d'Épargne de l'État, also known as Spuerkeess, was established in 1856.
- Chile: the Caja de Ahorros de Empleados Públicos de Chile was established in 1858 for the specific benefit of government employees.
- Brazil: the Caixa Economica e Monte de Socorro (Portuguese: Savings Bank and Mount of Piety) was established in 1861, and merged with other public institutions in 1967 to form Caixa Econômica Federal.
- Japan: the Tokyo Savings Bank was established in 1880. The first national savings banks legislation was enacted in 1893, and by 1906 there were 486 savings banks in the country. Despite their inspiration by foreign models, Japanese savings banks had a more commercial or even speculative orientation, which led to widespread financial fragility among them. In 1921-1922, a long-delayed regulatory tightening led to all savings banks closing or merging into ordinary banks between then and the late 1940s, after which savings banks ceased to exist in Japan as a separate category. Several of the last remaining savings banks merged in May 1945 to form Japan Savings Bank Inc. (Japanese: 株式会社日本貯蓄銀行), which in 1948 renamed itself Kyowa Bank and eventually became part of Resona Holdings as the result of successive mergers and restructurings from 1991 to 2003.
- Portugal: the Caixa Económica Portuguesa (lit. 'Portuguese Savings Bank') was established as a nationwide entity in 1880, and merged in 1885 with Caixa Geral de Depósitos.
- Romania: the Casa de Depuneri și Consemnațiuni (est. 1864) was renamed Casa de Depuneri, Consemnațiuni și Economie (lit. 'Deposits, Consignments and Savings Bank') in 1880 and in 1881 established a subsidiary named the Savings Bank (Romanian: Casa de Economie). It has remained state-owned and been branded CEC Bank since 2008.
- San Marino: the Cassa di Risparmio della Repubblica di San Marino was established in 1882.
- Panama: the Caja de Ahorro en Panamá was established in 1934 as a national public bank.
- Poland: the General Savings Bank (Polish: Powszechna Kasa Oszczędności) was established in 1950 on the basis of the former postal saving system, since then known as PKO Bank Polski.
- Peru: the Cajas Municipales de Ahorro y Crédito (lit. 'municipal savings and credit banks') are microfinance institutions that have developed as municipally owned public enterprises since 1982.
- Bulgaria: the State Savings Bank (Bulgarian: Държавна спестовна каса / DSK, est. 1951) has become DSK Bank, eventually purchased by Hungary's OTP Bank in 2003.
- Ukraine: the State Specialized Commercial Savings Bank of Ukraine was established in 1991 from the former Savings Bank of the USSR, and converted in 1999 into a state-owned joint-stock bank, the State Savings Bank of Ukraine (Ukrainian: Державний ощадний банк України), also known as Oschadbank.
- Albania: the Savings Bank of Albania (Albanian: Banka e Kursimeve e Shqipërisë) was established in 1992 and purchased in 2004 by Raiffeisen Bank International.
- Botswana: the Botswana Savings Bank was established in 1992 as a national public development bank.
- Sudan: the Savings and Social Development Bank, a microfinance institution, was established in 1995 in Khartoum.
- North Macedonia: savings banks, such as Opportunities Savings Bank (est. 1996) and Fulm Savings Banks (est. 1999), are licensed microfinance institutions.

== Representation ==
The World Savings Banks Institute (WSBI), was created in 1924 in Milan, relocated in 1949 in Amsterdam and again in 1969 in Geneva and in 1994 in Brussels. Since then, the WSBI and the European Savings Banks Group (est. 1963) have operated as a single entity, representing savings banks on a European and global basis and serves as a forum to compare savings banks practices. Most of its non-European members are cooperative banks, public banks, or postal savings systems rather than savings banks in the original European sense.

== See also ==
- Eufiserv
