= Unicredito =

Former Italian bank

UniCredito S.p.A.
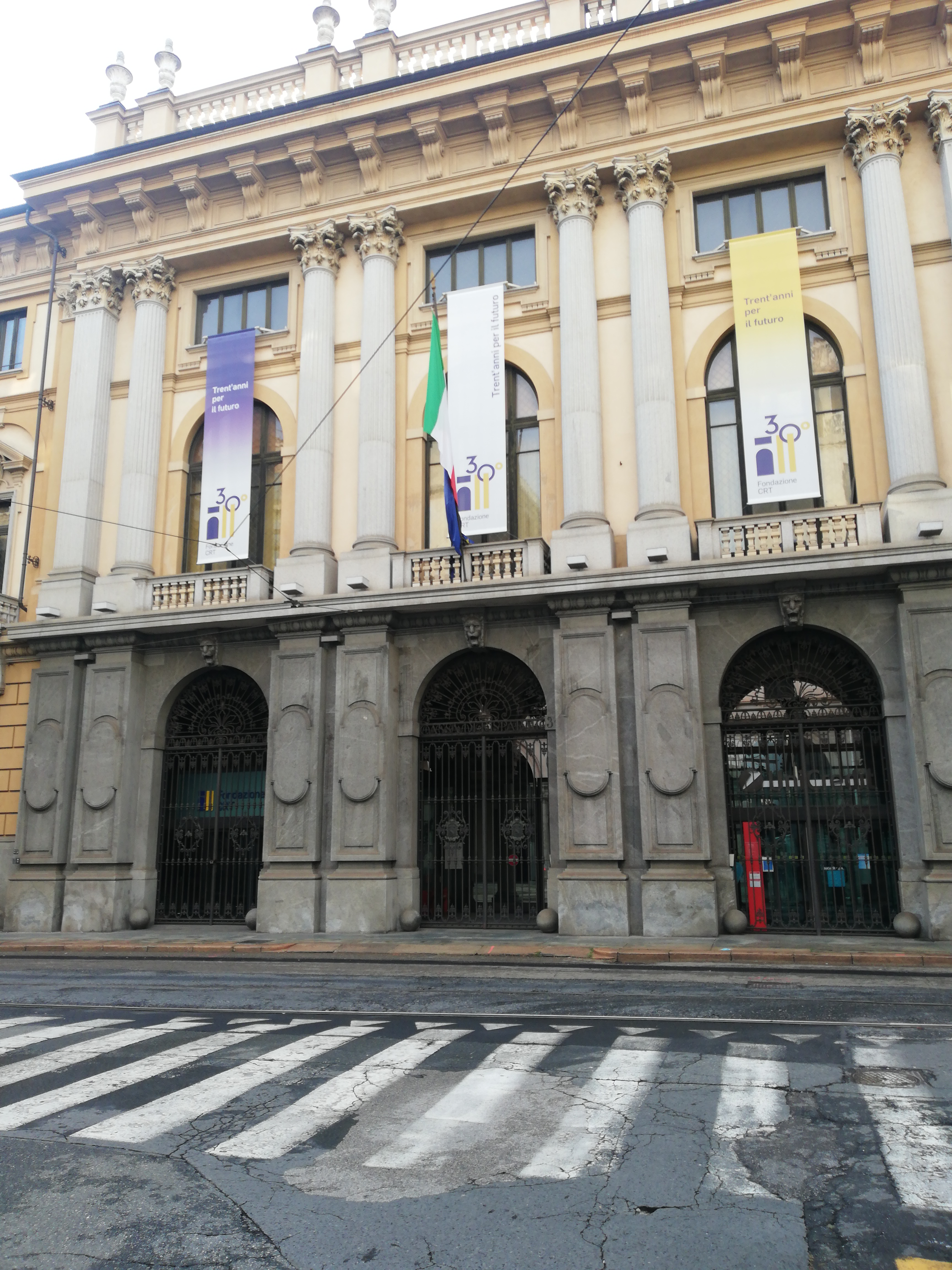
- Building on Via XX Settembre 29-31 in Turin, head office of Unicredito in 1997-1998
- Company type: Private S.p.A.
- Industry: Financial services
- Founded: 1994; 32 years ago
- Defunct: 1998
- Fate: Merged with Credito Italiano
- Successor: UniCredito Italiano
- Headquarters: Turin, Italy
- Area served: Italy
- Owner: Fondazione Cassamarca (11%); Fondazione CRT (43.9%); Fondazione Cariverona (43.9%); Fondazione CRTrieste (1.3%)
- Subsidiaries: Cassamarca; Banca CRT; Cariverona Banca

Unicredito was an Italian bank holding company that existed under that name for a brief time, from 1994 to 1998. It was initially formed by the banking foundations of Cassa di Risparmio di Verona, Vicenza, Belluno e Ancona (Cariverona Banca) and Cassa di Risparmio della Marca Trivigiana (Cassamarca) respectively owning 83.5 percent and 16.5 percent of UniCredito's equity. In 1997, the banking foundation of Cassa di Risparmio di Torino (Banca CRT) joined the venture. In 1998, Unicredito merged with Credito Italiano to form UniCredito Italiano, later branded as UniCredit.

== Subsidiaries ==
- Cassa di Risparmio di Verona, Vicenza, Belluno e Ancona (Cariverona Banca)
- Cassa di Risparmio della Marca Trivigiana (Cassamarca)
- Cassa di Risparmio di Torino (Banca CRT)

== Equity investments ==
- Cassa di Risparmio di Trieste
- Cassa di Risparmio di Bra
- Cassa di Risparmio di Fossano
- Cassa di Risparmio di Saluzzo
- Banca Cassa di Risparmio di Savigliano

== Other acquisition ==
- Monte di Credito su Pegno di Vicenza (1996)

== Shareholders ==
- Fondazione Cariverona
- Fondazione Cassamarca
- Fondazione CRT
- Fondazione Caritrieste

== See also ==
- List of banks in Italy
