= City Savings Bank =

City Savings Bank refers to savings banks controlled by municipal authorities, many of which were established in Europe in the 19th and 20th centuries. Examples include:

- City Savings Bank of Zagreb, a former Croatian bank
- Stadtsparkasse München, the City Savings Bank of Munich, Germany
- Haus der Stadtsparkasse (Bremen), the City Savings Bank building in Bremen, Germany

== See also ==
- CitySavings, a bank in the Philippines
- Cassa di Risparmio (disambiguation), a list that includes a number of municipal savings banks
