= Associazione Bancaria Italiana =

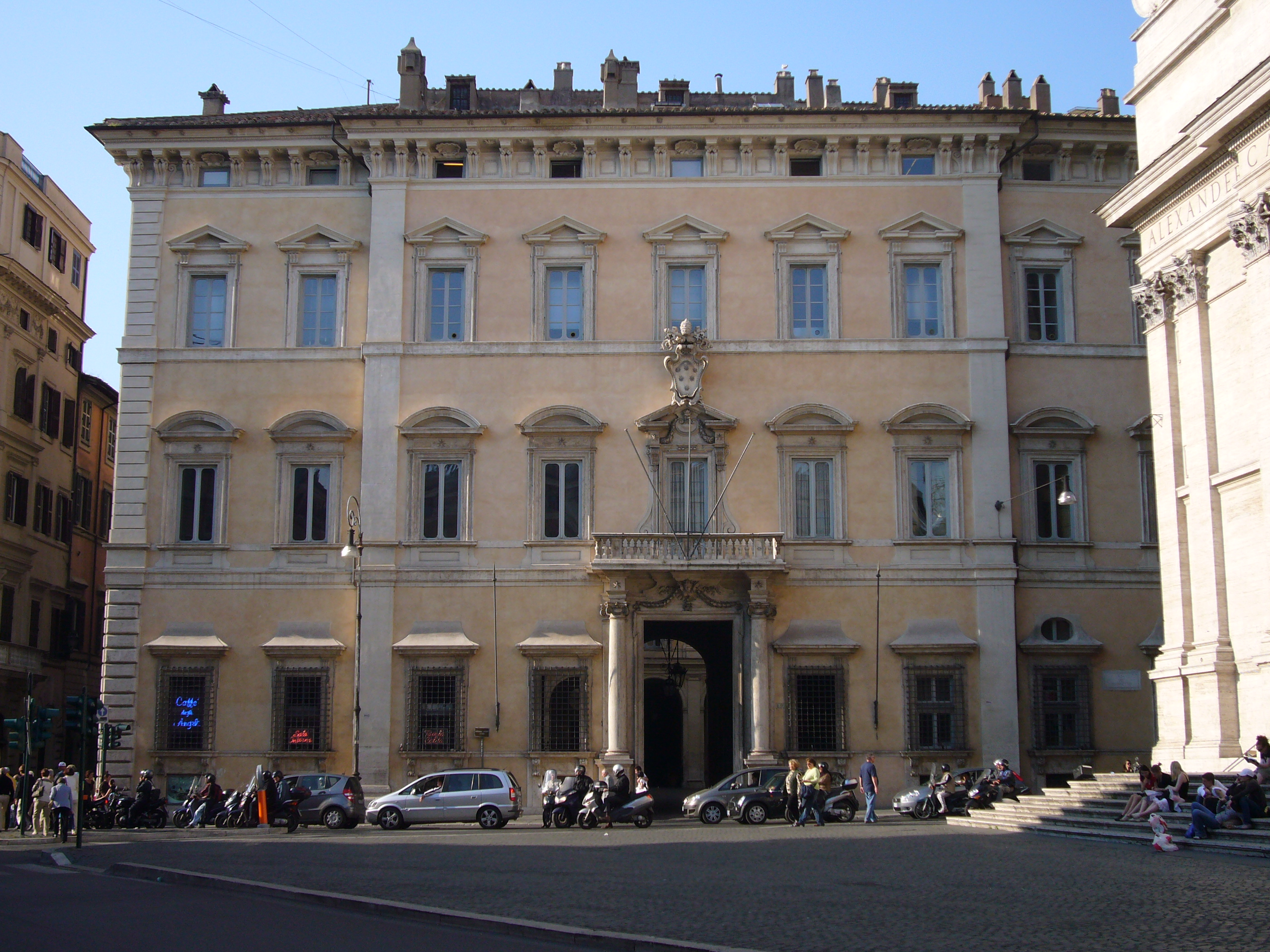
- Abbreviation: ABI
- Formation: April 13, 1919; 106 years ago
- Headquarters: Rome
- Official language: Italian

Associazione Bancaria Italiana is the trade association of Italian banks. The association was founded in 1919, few years after the Association of Italian Saving Banks (ACRI, founded 1912), the Association of Italian Rural Credit Unions (Cassa Rurale ed Artigiana, founded 1915) and more than 40 years after the Association of Popular Banks of Italy (Banca Popolare, founded 1876).

== History ==
The Associazione Bancaria Italiana was established in Milan in 1919 amid expanding economic associationism in Italy, with representatives from 53 banks approving its first articles of association in 1920. During the corporatist period of the 1920s and 1930s, ABI was integrated into the structure of the National Banking Confederation and lost some autonomy; a separate technical association was briefly established in 1936 but dissolved in 1937. Following World War II, the association was reconstituted in 1945 as a representative body open to all banks operating in Italy, tasked with protecting the general interests of the sector in a unified manner.

In the decades after the war, ABI became a key intermediary between banking institutions and public authorities. Legislative reforms in the 1990s, including the Amato‑Carli Law and the introduction of the Consolidated Banking Law, transformed the Italian banking system and expanded ABI’s role in coordinating regulatory implementation and supporting banks in adapting to liberalised and European markets. In 1997, the merger with the Trade Union Association of Credit Companies granted ABI direct union representation of banks, excluding certain cooperative sectors, and authority to define unified positions on labour relations and employment issues.

During the 1990s and 2000s, ABI guided the Italian banking sector through regulatory reform, European integration, and technological modernization. Giuseppe Zadra, serving as Director-General during much of this period, oversaw initiatives to improve transparency, consumer information, and interbank infrastructure. Programs such as PattiChiari, which provided standardized information on banking products, were launched, and the Corporate Banking Interbancario (CBI) platform was developed to facilitate electronic banking services for businesses.

During this period, ABI also represented Italian banks in European and international forums, contributing to discussions on regulatory standards, market transparency, and sector coordination. The association participated in initiatives coordinated by the European Banking Federation and the International Organization of Securities Commissions (IOSCO).

Since the 2000s, ABI has continued to support digital innovation, sustainability initiatives, and ongoing engagement with both national and European authorities, while promoting financial education and industry research.

== Chairmen ==
- Maurizio Sella (Banca Sella)
- Giuseppe Mussari (Banca Monte dei Paschi di Siena, ?–2013)
- Antonio Patuelli (Cassa di Risparmio di Ravenna, 2013–)

== Director-Generals ==
Name	Term
Giuseppe Zadra	1992–2009
Giovanni Sabatini	2009–2024
Marco Elio Rottigni	2024–

== See also ==
- List of banks in Italy
