= UniCredit Banca Mediocredito =

- Native name: UniCredit Banca Mediocredito S.p.A.
- Formerly: Mediocredito Piemontese; Banca Mediocredito
- Company type: subsidiary of a listed company
- Industry: Financial services
- Defunct: 31 December 2005
- Successor: UniCredit Banca d'Impresa; UniCredit Infrastrutture; UniCredit Real Estate; 2S Banca
- Headquarters: Turin, Italy
- Services: Commercial banking
- Net income: ▲€31 million (2004)
- Total assets: ▼€5.132 billion (2004)
- Total equity: ▲€406.992 million (2004)
- Owner: UniCredit (95.96%)
- Parent: UniCredit
- Footnotes / references 2004 data

UniCredit Banca Mediocredito S.p.A. (UBMC) was an Italian commercial bank. The bank was dismantled on 31 December 2015, but the bank license was retained, which became 2S Banca, a company that specialized in securities service activities. On 4 October 2006 2S Banca was sold to Société Générale Security Services, a subsidiary of Société Générale for €579.3 million.

== History ==
Mediocredito Piemontese was found as a statutory corporation (Italian: ente di diritto pubblico). Due to Legge Amato, the bank became a limited company (Italian: società per azioni) in 1992. At that time the bank was already a subsidiary of Cassa di Risparmio di Torino (Banca CRT), which Banca Popolare di Novara (BPN) also owned a reported 32.85% capital of the bank in 1990. (disinvested to 10% share capital as at 31 December 2000) The bank was also renamed into Banca Mediocredito S.p.A. in the 1990s.

In 1997 Mediocredito followed the parent company to join Unicredito, which was merged with Credito Italiano to form UniCredito Italiano in 1998 (UniCredit). As at 31 December 2000, Banca CRT owned 63.26% shares of Banca Mediocredito, as well as Cariverona owned 0.20% shares, making UniCredit controlled 63.46% shares of Banca Mediocredito (despite UniCredit did not own the 0.25% minority interests of Cariverona). In 2001 UniCredit acquired 10% shares of Mediocredito from BPN, as well as an additional 0.63% from other companies. In 2002 UniCredit acquired the minority interests of the Mediocredito from Cassa di Risparmio di Biella e Vercelli (6.063% for €20.354 million), Banca Lombarda e Piemontese (5.83% for €19.569 million), Banca Carige (1.755% for €6.23 million), Sanpaolo IMI (1.11%), Banca Intesa (0.27%), Cassa di Risparmio di Savona (0.25% for €0.873 million), Carispezia (0.11%) and other companies; as a result UniCredit owned 92.23% shares of Mediocredito directly as at 31 December 2002, also due to Banca CRT and Cariverona were absorbed into UniCredit. An additional 3.73% shares was acquired during year 2004 and 3.94% during 2005.

A sister company, Mediovenezie Banca (of Cariverona Banca), was restructured to become UniCredito Gestione Crediti in 2002; in 2003 Banca Mediocredito was also renamed to UniCredit Banca Mediocredito.

The company was restructured on 31 December 2005 which its business were transferred to UniCredit Banca d'Impresa (medium-to-long term financing and special loans), UniCredit Infrastrutture (project finance), UniCredit Real Estate (real estate), UniCredit Sistemi Informativi (Information Technology) and UniCredit Produzioni Accentrate (back office). The bank license was retained and the company was transformed into 2S Banca.
