= Cassa di Risparmio di Cento =

Italian savings bank

- Company type: unlisted public società per azioni
- ISIN: IT0001022182
- Industry: Financial services
- Founded: 1859; 1991 (S.p.A.)
- Headquarters: Cento, Emilia-Romagna, Italy
- Key people: Carlo Alberto Roncarati (chairman); Mauro Manuzzi (vice-chairman); Ivan Damiano (General Manager)
- Products: Retail banking
- Net income: ▼€2 million (2016)
- Total assets: €2.854 billion (2016)
- Total equity: €196 million (2016)
- Owner: Fondazione Caricento (67.08%); Ennio & Mauro Manuzzi (10.88%); general public (22.04%)
- Parent: Fondazione Caricento
- Capital ratio: ▲12.41% (CET1, Dec.2016)
- Website: www.crcento.it
- Footnotes / references source

Cassa di Risparmio di Cento S.p.A. (known as CR Cento or Caricento in short) is an Italian savings bank based in Cento, Emilia-Romagna, which serve the Province of Ferrara, Bologna and Modena.

== History ==
The bank was found on 26 April 1844 in Cento, in the Papal States and open to the public on 27 March 1859. In December 1991, due to Legge Amato, the daily banking operation and ownership were split into a società per azioni and Fondazione Cassa di Risparmio di Cento, a banking foundation. Which the bank still majority owned by the foundation, through direct and indirect ownership (Holding Cassa di Risparmio di Cento S.p.A.). Casse Emiliano Romagnole was a minority shareholder for 20% shares, but sold the shares back to the foundation in 1997.

In October 2017, northern Italy bank Banca Popolare di Sondrio announced that the bank had interested to buy CR Cento, after fellow savings banks of Emilia-Romagna were acquired by BPER Banca and Crédit Agricole Italia in 2017.

== Banking foundation ==
Fondazione Cassa di Risparmio di Cento currently held an equity of €56 million as of 31 December 2013. The foundation sponsored Prize Cento, a prize for literature.

== See also ==
savings bank from the Province of Ferrara

- Cassa di Risparmio di Ferrara, a subsidiary of BPER Banca

savings bank from the provincial capital of Emilia-Romagna

- Cassa di Risparmio in Bologna, a subsidiary of Intesa Sanpaolo
- Cassa di Risparmio di Cesena, a subsidiary of Crédit Agricole Italia
- Cassa di Risparmio di Parma e Piacenza, also known as Crédit Agricole Italia, a subsidiary of Crédit Agricole
  - Cassa di Risparmio di Piacenza e Vigevano
- Cassa di Risparmio di Modena, predecessor of UniCredit
- Cassa di Risparmio di Ravenna
- Cassa di Risparmio di Reggio Emilia, predecessor of Capitalia
- Cassa di Risparmio di Rimini (Banca Carim), a subsidiary of Crédit Agricole Italia
