= Palazzo Giacomo Spinola =

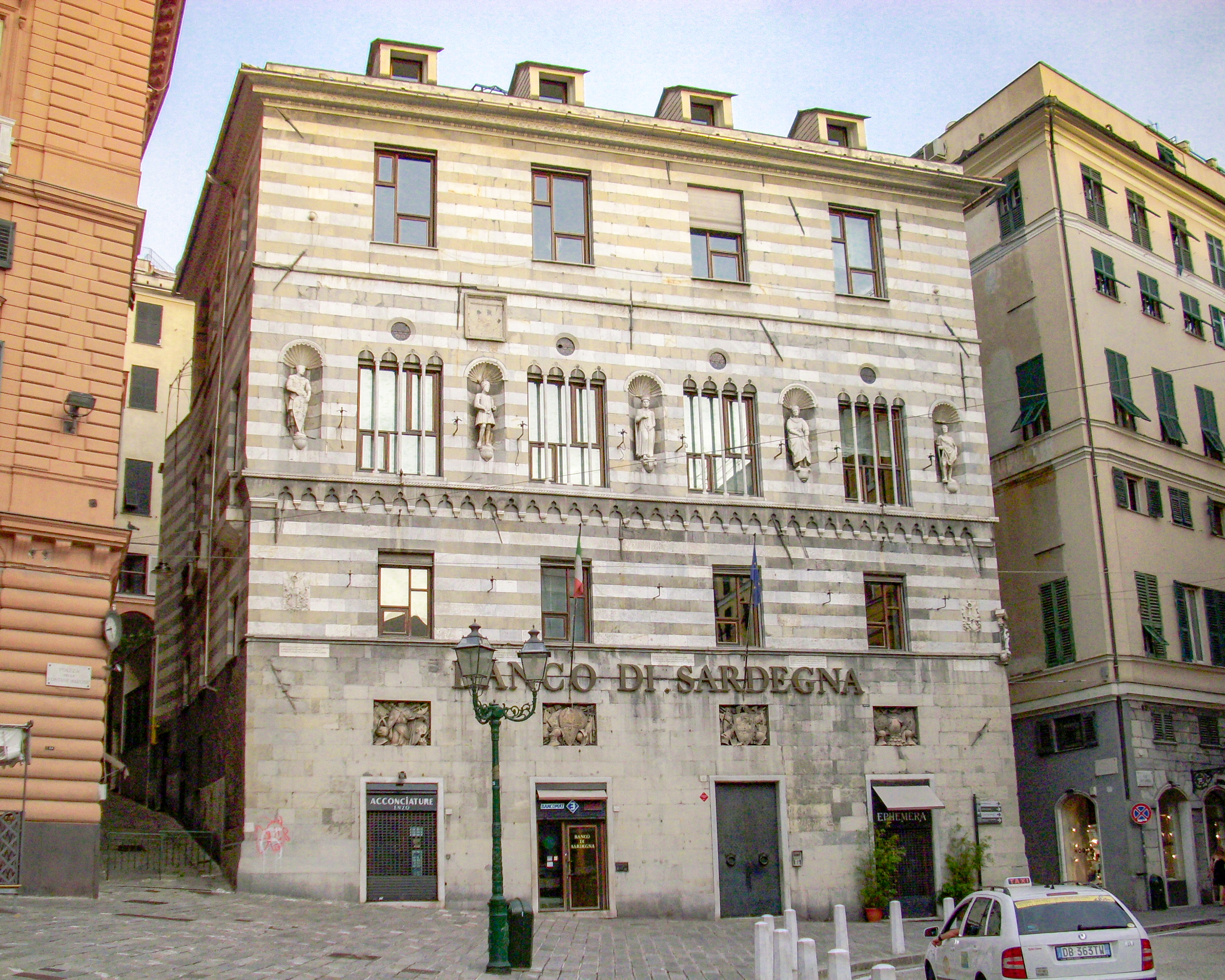
- Facade of the Palazzo Giacomo Spinola in Piazza delle Fontane Marose, 6
- Interactive map of the Palazzo Giacomo Spinola area
- Alternative names: Palazzo Giacomo Spinola dei Marmi, Palazzo Giacomo Spinola di Luccoli

General information
- Status: In use
- Type: Palace
- Architectural style: Mannerist
- Location: Genoa, Italy, 6, Piazza delle Fontane Marose
- Coordinates: 44.409997°N 8.935503°E
- Current tenants: offices
- Construction started: 1445
- Completed: 1459

UNESCO World Heritage Site
- Part of: Genoa: Le Strade Nuove and the system of the Palazzi dei Rolli
- Criteria: Cultural: (ii)(iv)
- Reference: 1211
- Inscription: 2006 (30th Session)

The palazzo Giacomo Spinola or palazzo Giacomo Spinola di Luccoli is a building located in Piazza delle Fontane Marose at number 6 in Genoa, included on 13 July 2006 in the list of the 42 palaces inscribed in the Rolli di Genova that became World Heritage by UNESCO on that date. The palace is now home to the Banco di Sardegna.

== History and description ==
Built for Giacomo Spinola between 1445 and 1459 on already built plots, it is present in all the rolli; between the years 1576 and 1595 it belongs to Antonio Spinola Marmari but it reaches its highest position in 1614 with Giovanni Battista Spinola di Tomaso, man of letters and doge of the Republic of Genoa in 1613–1615. At the beginning of the 19th century it belongs to the Spinola.

Situated on the Piazza di Luccoli, in the 13th century, a marginal but strategic location because it is close to the Porta di Santa Caterina (St. Catherine's Gate), it has a façade with two-coloured bands and niches with marble statues of illustrious family members, three of which (the first, second and fourth from the left) were executed by Domenico Gagini da Bissone. In the 16th century, in addition to the replacement of the four-light windows to create new windows, the block was expanded with a revenue house on Via di San Sebastiano.

In the mid-19th century, bas-relief panels were imposed by the municipality to disguise the stretching of the shops downwards: a transformation of the façade produced first by the general levelling of the carriageway, from the Acquaverde to the Acquasola, with partial demolition of the upper piazza of the Spinola family (1816—1818 circa), then required by the later junctions of the new via Carlo Felice (1832 circa) with the old levels of the piazza.

After the unlawful demolition to modernise the windows in 1903, architects Alfredo D'Andrade and Marco Aurelio Crotta built the polyphora on the piano nobile, which had already been replaced with rectangular openings for centuries, just as the interior had been significantly altered in the staircase (16th century).

Equally heavy were the works at the end of the 19th century, introduced by the Migone property to reduce the palazzo to a rented house, to the point of multiplying old false ceilings masking the original wooden ceiling of the hall, on brackets bearing the Spinola family's coat of arms, which is now restored by a recovery project sponsored by the Banco di Sardegna to house offices and an agency.

== Picture Gallery ==
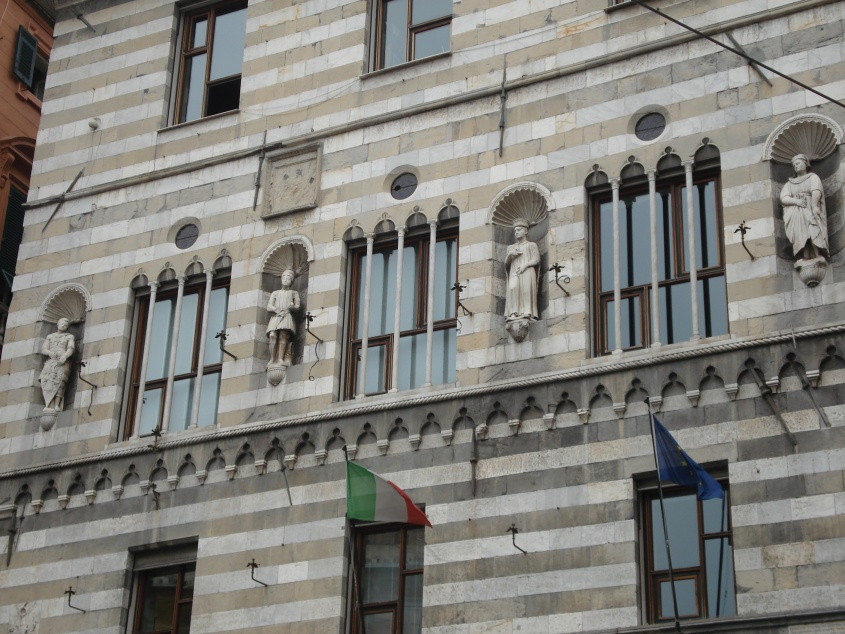
Palazzo Giacomo Spinola

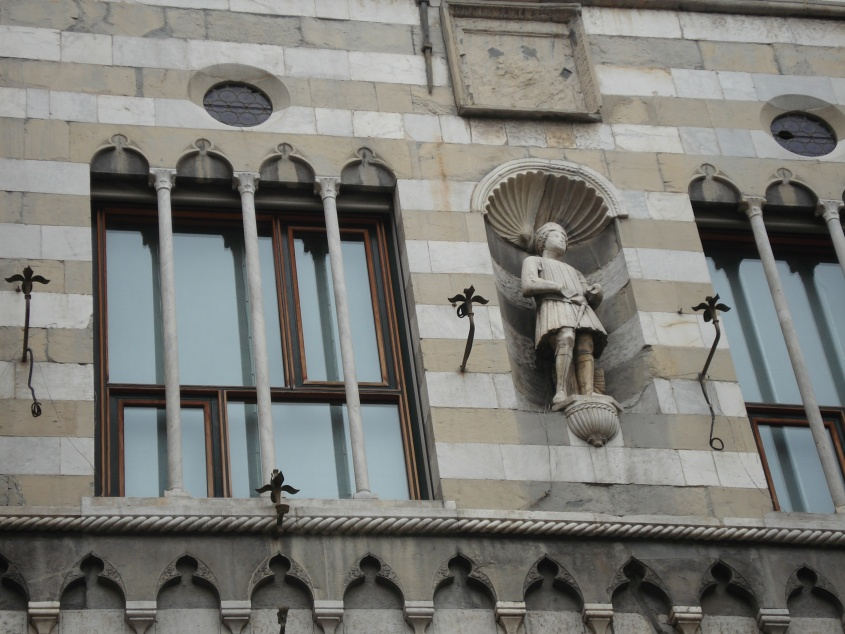
One of the marble statues

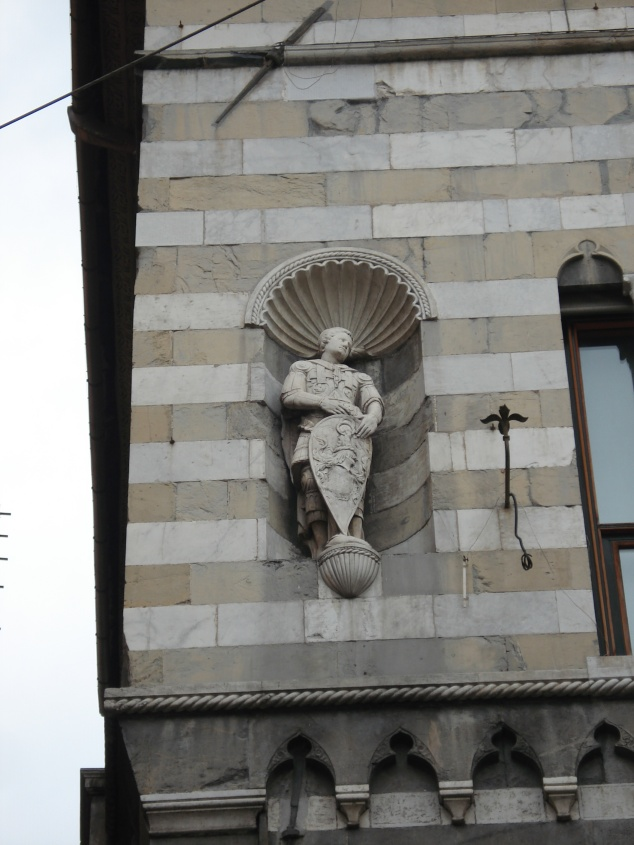
One of the marble statues on the second floor

== Sources ==
=== Italian sources ===
- Guida ai palazzi dei Rolli di Genova, a cura di A. M. Parodi, Genova, Banca Carige, 2007.
- Alizeri Federico, Guida illustrativa del cittadino e del forastiero per la città di Genova e sue adiacenze, Bologna, Forni Editore, 1972 pag. 229
- Poleggi Ennio e Poleggi Fiorella (Presentazione, ricerca iconografica e note a cura di), Descrizione della città di Genova da un anonimo del 1818, Genova, Sagep, 1969 pag. 215
