= 2010 Trofeo Cassa di Risparmio =

2010 Trofeo Cassa di Risparmio may refer to two ATP tennis tournament, both sponsored by Italian saving banks (Italian: Cassa di Risparmio) from Alessandria and Ascoli Piceno respectively:

- 2010 Alessandria Challenger (2009 Trofeo Cassa di Risparmio di Alessandria)
- 2010 San Benedetto Tennis Cup (2010 Carisap Tennis Cup)

== See also ==
- Cassa di Risparmio (disambiguation)
