= 2009 Trofeo Cassa di Risparmio =

2009 Trofeo Cassa di Risparmio may refer to two ATP tennis tournaments, both sponsored by Italian saving banks (Italian: Cassa di Risparmio) from Alessandria and Ascoli Piceno respectively:

- 2009 Alessandria Challenger (2009 Trofeo Cassa di Risparmio di Alessandria)
- 2009 San Benedetto Tennis Cup (2009 Carisap Tennis Cup)

== See also ==
- Cassa di Risparmio (disambiguation)
