= Banca del Monte e Cassa di Risparmio Faenza =

- Native name: Banca del Monte e Cassa di Risparmio Faenza S.p.A.
- Company type: private Società per Azioni
- Industry: Financial services
- Founded: 1491 (Mount of piety); 1991 (S.p.A. and Foundation)
- Defunct: 1995 (S.p.A. only)
- Fate: merger with C.R.B.M. Lugo
- Successor: B.M.C.R. Faenza Foundation; Banca di Romagna
- Headquarters: Faenza, Italy
- Services: retail banking

Banca del Monte e Cassa di Risparmio Faenza was an Italian saving bank and a charity organization, based in Faenza, in the Province of Ravenna, Romagna. The banking activities were merged with counterparts from Lugo to form Banca di Romagna, while the charity function survived as Fondazione Banca del Monte e Cassa di Risparmio Faenza.

== Bank ==
The bank was found by local mount of piety, which itself was found in 1491. Due to 1990s Italian banking reform, the bank transformed from a statutory corporation to a società per azioni, by incorporating Banca del Monte e Cassa di Risparmio Faenza S.p.A. as a subsidiary of the statutory corporation. At the same time the articles of association of the statutory corporation were modified to become a private legal person, as Fondazione Banca del Monte e Cassa di Risparmio Faenza, or Fondazione Monte Faenza in short). Cassa di Risparmio in Bologna (Carisbo) also subscribed to the capital increase of the S.p.A. At the same time the banking foundation of B.M.C.R. Faenza, subscribed to a minority stake in Casse Emiliano Romagnole, the holding company of Carisbo, by injecting part of the stake of B.M.C.R. Faenza S.p.A. as capital.

The S.p.A. was merged with Cassa di Risparmio e Banca del Monte Lugo to form Banca di Romagna in 1995.

== Banking foundation ==
Fondazione Banca del Monte e Cassa di Risparmio Faenza was the owner of the bank since 1992 until the merger in 1995. After the merger the foundation was a shareholder of Banca di Romagna. In 1999 Banca di Romagna was merged with Cassa di Risparmio di Cesena (Carisp Cesena). A new holding company, Unibanca, owned both Carisp Cesena and Banca di Romagna, while the foundation owned the share of Unibanca instead, for 6.877% stake. In 2010 Carisp Cesena was absorbed by Unibanca, but Unibanca was renamed to Cassa di Risparmio di Cesena at the same time.

As at 31 December 2015, the foundation still owned 6.462% stake in Carisp Cesena. However, after Carisp Cesena suffered from huge write-down and provision for their bad loan, the bank was bail-out by the voluntary scheme of Fondo Interbancario di Tutela dei Depositi for €280 million in September 2016. 560 million new shares were issued, making the stake of B.M.C.R. Faenza Foundation diluted to 0.31%, despite the foundation also receiving free warrants for additional new shares.

The foundation, as at 31 December 2015, also owned 0.010% of Cassa Depositi e Prestiti. The shareholders' equity of the foundation was €17,913,448. However, about half of the value was contributed by the value of the shares of Carisp Cesena. The failure of the bank would affect the equity of the foundation in 2016.

The foundation was a member of Associazione di Fondazioni e di Casse di Risparmio S.p.A.

== See also ==
- Cassa di Risparmio di Ravenna, an operating bank from the provincial capital
- List of banks in Italy
