= Sparkasse Schwyz =

Swiss regional savings bank

Coordinates: 47.0220°N 8.6510°E

Sparkasse Schwyz AG is a regional savings bank in the Swiss Canton of Schwyz, founded in 1812 and thus one of the oldest banks in continuous operation in the world. The bank has offices in Schwyz, Brunnen, Goldau and Küssnacht am Rigi. As of 2008, it had 61 employees. It is associated with RBA-Holding.

The bank's main shareholder is the municipality of Schwyz.

== Literature ==
- Hans Steinegger, Alois Suter, Markus Barnert, Schwyzer Herrengasse: 175 Jahre Sparkasse Schwyz, 1812-1987, 1987
