= Cassa dei Risparmi di Forlì e della Romagna =

Cassa dei Risparmi di Forlì e della Romagna S.p.A.
- Formerly: Cassa di Risparmio di Forlì; Cassa dei Risparmi di Forlì
- Type: Subsidiary
- Industry: Financial services
- Founded: 1839 in Forlì, the Papal States; 1992 in Forlì as a S.p.A.
- Defunct: 2018
- Fate: absorbed by Intesa Sanpaolo
- Successors: Fondazione Cariforlì; branches of Intesa Sanpaolo
- Headquarters: Forlì, Italy
- Number of locations: ▼77 branches (2017)
- Area served: Romagna region, Italy
- Key people: Adriano Maestri (Chairman)
- Brands: Cariromagna; Cariforlì
- Services: retail banking; corporate banking
- Net income: ▼€−21.8 million (2017)
- Total assets: ▲€5,254.2 million (2017)
- Total equity: ▼€256.8 million (2017)
Owners
Intesa Sanpaolo	(82.30%)
Fondazione Cariforlì	(10.74%)
- Number of employees: ▼797 (2017)
- Capital ratio: 11.0% (CET1 capital ratio at 2017-12-31)
- Website: www.cariromagna.it
- Footnotes source of data

Cassa dei Risparmi di Forlì e della Romagna S.p.A., known as Cariromagna, was an Italian savings bank based in Forlì, Emilia-Romagna region. Despite the bank having become branches of Intesa Sanpaolo in 2018, the former parent company of the bank (before the takeover by Intesa), Fondazione Cassa dei Risparmi di Forlì, as of 2019, is still in operation as a banking foundation and charity organization.

The bank also had former names Cassa di Risparmio di Forlì and Cassa dei Risparmi di Forlì and Cassa dei Risparmi di Forlì S.p.A..

== History ==
Found in 1839 by a decree of Pope Gregory XVI in Forlì, in the Papal States, Cassa di Risparmio di Forlì (Cariforlì in short, renamed to Cassa dei Risparmi di Forlì in 1859) was a savings bank which serves Forlì and the surrounding area. In 1992, due to Legge Amato, the bank was split into two entities, Fondazione Cassa dei Risparmi di Forlì (Fondazione Cariforlì) which serves as the owner and a philanthropic organization, and "Cassa dei Risparmi di Forlì S.p.A." as the company to run bank activities.

In 2000, Sanpaolo IMI acquired the bank minority rights to serve as a strategic partner. Banca CR Firenze also acquired minority interests on the bank. On 31 December 2006, Sanpaolo IMI held 38.25% voting rights and share capitals, while Banca CR Firenze held 11.614% ordinary shares and preferred shares worth 1.136% of the shares capital. The banking foundation only retained 28.38% as the second largest shareholder. Private citizens owned 20.62%.

The bank was renamed to Cassa dei Risparmi di Forlì e della Romagna (in short "Cariromagna") on 19 March 2007 to serve for the banking group as a brand in the Romagna region. In the same year Sanpaolo IMI and Banca CR Firenze were merged with Banca Intesa to become one of the two multi-national banking groups of Italy, Intesa Sanpaolo (the other one was UniCredit). Cariromagna received branches from other subsidiaries of the banking group to enhance its branch network in the region.

Followed the announcement of the business plan of Intesa Sanpaolo, the banking group retired the brand Cassa dei Risparmi di Forlì e della Romagna. Intesa Sanpaolo also absorbed the legal person of Cassa dei Risparmi di Forlì e della Romagna in the same year.

== Sponsorship ==
The bank was a sponsor of local football team Forlì F.C., which plays in 2012–13 Lega Pro Seconda Divisione.

== Banking foundation ==
Fondazione Cassa dei Risparmi di Forlì was the original legal entity of the bank, as well as the largest shareholder of the new legal person since 1992. After the bank was acquired by Intesa Sanpaolo, the foundation retained a minority stake. The foundation still served as a charity organization for the Romagna region and the city of Forlì .

== See also ==
- Cassa di Risparmio di Cesena - another bank from the Province of Forlì-Cesena
- Cassa di Risparmio di Ravenna - another bank from Romagna
- Banca Carim - another bank from Romagna
- Cassa di Risparmio della Repubblica di San Marino, a bank from the micro-nation San Marino, geographically in Romagna
- List of banks in Italy
