= Banking foundation =

Banking foundation is a type of foundation that originated as a bank. The banking reforms split the banks (usually local and community owned savings banks, as a statutory corporation) into limited company and holding company (or banking foundation).

== Austria ==
- ERSTE Foundation

== Germany ==
- Haspa Finanzholding - parent of Hamburger Sparkasse

== Italy ==
- Fondazione di Sardegna
- Members of Associazione di Fondazioni e di Casse di Risparmio S.p.A.
- Fondazione Pisa
- Fondazione Roma
- Fondazione Sicilcassa (defunct)
- Fondazione Banca Monte Lugo (merged with other foundations)
- Fondazione Cassa di Risparmio di Lugo (merged with other foundations)
- Fondazione Compagnia di San Paolo

== Norway ==
- Sparebankstiftelsen DnB

== San Marino ==
- Fondazione San Marino

== Spain ==
- La Caixa
