= Carisport =

Event arena in Cesena, Italy

Coordinates: 44.1455°N 12.2269°E

Nuovo Teatro Carisport
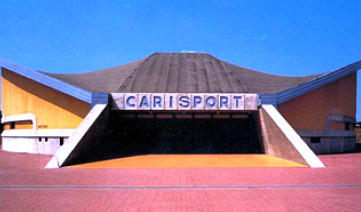
- Interactive map of Nuovo Teatro Carisport
- Location: Piazzale Paolo Tordi 99, Cesena
- Owner: Comune di Cesena
- Capacity: 3608

Construction
- Opened: 1985

The Nuovo Teatro Carisport, better known as Carisport, is a multipurpose indoor sports/concert arena located in Cesena, Italy. The City of Cesena (Comune di Cesena) is the owner of the venue, although it is managed by Consorzio Romagna Iniziative.

== History and events ==
It was opened in 1985 and simultaneously named "Carisport", with reference (Caris) to the bank (Cassa di Risparmio di Cesena) who had designed and supervised the project and the construction, along with the city administration (Comune di Cesena).

The Carisport hosted important basketball, volleyball and football competition. It is also the official venue of the volleyball club Pallavolo Cesena and the former venue of the Associazione Sportiva Romagna Calcio a 5.

Since the opening, the structure has had two big operations of restyling: one in 2001 and one in 2012.

The arena is also the most important concert venue of the city and it is also used as city theater. It hosted music concerts from national and international artists, opera, drama theater and shows of the most important national comedians. Many important artists performed concerts in the arena, such as: Laura Pausini, Morrissey, Foo Fighters, Goran Bregović, Steve Hackett, Nek, Marco Mengoni, Carmen Consoli, Massimo Ranieri, Franco Battiato, Francesco De Gregori, Daniele Silvestri, Alex Britti, Mario Biondi, Marco Masini, Raf, Marco Carta, Francesco Renga, Negramaro, Caparezza, Fiorella Mannoia, Elio e le storie tese, Raphael Gualazzi, Antonello Venditti, Morgan and Sophia Philharmonic.
