= Cassa di Risparmio di Cuneo =

CR Cuneo
- Native name: Cassa di Risparmio di Cuneo
- Founded: 1855
- Defunct: 1995
- Fate: merger
- Successor: Banca Regionale Europea
- Headquarters: Cuneo, Italy
- Owner: Fondazione Cassa di Risparmio di Cuneo

Cassa di Risparmio di Cuneo S.p.A. was an Italian savings bank based in Cuneo, Piedmont. The organization ceased to operate as a bank, turning into a non-profit organization as Fondazione Cassa di Risparmio di Cuneo.

== History ==
Cassa di Risparmio di Cuneo was founded in 1855. Due to 1991 bank reform, two entity, namely Cassa di Risparmio di Cuneo S.p.A. and Fondazione Cassa di Risparmio di Cuneo were formed. On 1 January 1995 the S.p.A. merged with Banca del Monte di Lombardia S.p.A. to form Banca Regionale Europea (a subsidiary of Banca Lombarda e Piemontese since 2000 and UBI Banca since 2007. )

== Banking foundation ==
The former owner of the S.p.A., Fondazione Cassa di Risparmio di Cuneo, held 18.91% of the shares of Banca Regionale Europea in 2000, as well as 4% of Banca Lombarda. As of 31 December 2014, the foundation held 24.90% of Banca Regionale Europea as well as 2.230% of UBI Banca.

The foundation sponsored the restoration of Alba Cathedral.

== See also ==
- Cassa di Risparmio di Asti, independent bank, with Banca Popolare di Milano as minority owner
- Cassa di Risparmio di Alessandria, now part of Banca Popolare di Milano
- Cassa di Risparmio di Torino, now part of UniCredit
- Banca Cassa di Risparmio di Savigliano, partially owned by Banca Popolare dell'Emilia Romagna
- Cassa di Risparmio di Bra, a Banca Popolare dell'Emilia Romagna subsidiary
- Cassa di Risparmio di Fossano, partially owned by Banca Popolare dell'Emilia Romagna
- Cassa di Risparmio di Saluzzo, partially owned by Banca Popolare dell'Emilia Romagna
- List of banks in Italy
