= Fondazione CRT =

Charity organization in Turin, Italy

Fondazione Cassa di Risparmio di Torino (Fondazione CRT) is a charity organization formed in 1991 by the spin off of the bank activities Cassa di Risparmio di Torino into Banca CRT S.p.A. (a limited company), with the original statutory corporation became Fondazione CRT. The foundation was the major shareholders of Banca CRT S.p.A..

== Organization ==
Since the bank became a member of UniCredito, the foundation held the shares of UniCredito instead. UniCredito merged with Credito Italiano in 1998. In 1999 the foundation held 704,943,077 of 4,954,465,306 total ordinary shares (14.228%) of UniCredit (called UniCredito Italiano at that time), which was diluted to 14.092% in 2000, 14.029% in 2001, 11.235% in 2002 due to issue of new shares of UniCredit. Despite number of shares held decreased in the financial year 2003, the foundation became the largest shareholder of 8.741%, which the total issued ordinary shares of UniCredit had increased to 6,294,629,600. In the next year the foundation returned to second largest shareholder with 8.713% of 6,336,709,283 the ordinary shares, as well as Fondazione Cariverona returned as the largest one. In 2005 once again the number of total shares were changed (to 10,368,848,154), which the foundation was the second largest shareholder of 4.743%, behind Munich Re Group. Upon the merger with Capitalia in 2007, the Turin-based foundation was the third largest shareholder of 3.69%.

On 31 December 2006 the foundation had 491,744,753 number of shares UniCredit and 5,145,125 number of shares in Société Générale respectively, representing 4.721% (out of total 10,416,544,981) as the second largest shareholder of UniCredit. On 30 June 2006 Société Générale had 434,700,901 shares, a treasury stock of 20,535,404, as well as an equity of €29 billion, thus the foundation held about 1% of Société Générale's shares in open market, which the foundation claimed to worth €315 million in the audited accounts of the foundation, a P/B ratio of about 1.1.

The foundation also had a minority shareholding in Cassa Depositi e Prestiti.

== See also ==
- Lagrange Prize
