= Cassa di Risparmio di Tortona =

- Company type: subsidiary of a listed company
- Industry: Financial services
- Founded: 1911; 1991 (S.p.A.)
- Defunct: 2006 (merged into parent company)
- Headquarters: Tortona, Piedmont, Italy
- Products: Retail banking
- Owner: Fondazione Cassa di Risparmio di Tortona(1991–1999, majority); Banca Lombarda (1999–2006)
- Parent: Banca Lombarda e Piemontese

Cassa di Risparmio di Tortona was an Italian savings bank based in Tortona, Piedmont. The bank was merged into Banca Lombarda in 1999 (the predecessor of UBI Banca), while the former owner of the bank, Fondazione Cassa di Risparmio di Tortona, still operates as a charity organization.

== History ==
Cassa di Risparmio di Tortona was found in 1911. In 1991 due to Legge Amato, the daily banking operation and ownership were split into a Società per azioni (Banca Cassa di Risparmio di Tortona SpA) and Fondazione Cassa di Risparmio di Tortona. Cassa di Risparmio di Torino (Banca CRT) acquired minority ownership on CR Tortona in 1990s, for 25%. The shares of CR Tortona was sold CR Alessandria after Banca CRT joined Unicredito.

In 1999, the majority owner of CR Tortona SpA, Foundation CR Tortona, sold 60% shares of the bank to Banca Lombarda e Piemontese, which was completely disposed in 2006. The intermediate holding company of the bank circa 2004–05 was Banca Regionale Europea (60%), a subsidiary of Banca Lombarda, while Banca Lombarda only held 15.20% directly (acquired from the foundation in 2002 for €38,655,113.52). In 2006, Banca Regionale Europea acquired remain 24.8% shares of CR Tortona SpA from Foundation CR Tortona (0.1%) and Fondazione Cassa di Risparmio di Alessandria (24.7% for €38.5 million), which the bank was then absorbed. Banca Lombarda also merged with Banche Popolari Unite in 2007 to form UBI Banca.

Banca Regionale Europea, the former intermediate parent company, was also absorbed by UBI Banca in 2016.

== Banking Foundation ==
Fondazione Cassa di Risparmio di Tortona still acted as a charity organization. It had an equity of €211,157,304 on 31 December 2013.

== See also ==
- List of banks in Italy
