= Banca del Monte di Foggia =

- Native name: Banca del Monte di Foggia S.p.A.
- Formerly: Banca del Monte di Foggia Monte di Credito su Pegno
- Type: subsidiary of a listed company
- Industry: Financial services
- Founded: 1588 (as Mount of Piety); 1994 (S.p.A.)
- Defunct: 2006
- Fate: absorbed by Banca della Campania
- Successor: Monte Foggia Foundation; Banca della Campania
- Headquarters: Foggia, Italy
- Owner: Banca Popolare dell'Emilia Romagna
- Parent: Banca Popolare dell'Emilia Romagna

Banca del Monte di Foggia S.p.A. also known as Banca del Monte "Domenico Siniscalco-Ceci" di Foggia in honor a sponsor, was an Italian regional bank based in Foggia, Apulia region.

Due to Legge Amato, the statutory corporation was split into a Società per Azioni and a banking foundation on 6 December 1994. The bank sector was sold in 1998 and absorbed into Banca della Campania on 28 December 2006, both as a subsidiary of Banca Popolare dell'Emilia Romagna. Fondazione Banca del Monte di Foggia, still acts as a charity organization.

== See also ==
- List of banks in Italy
