= Cassa di Risparmio di Asti =

Italian saving bank

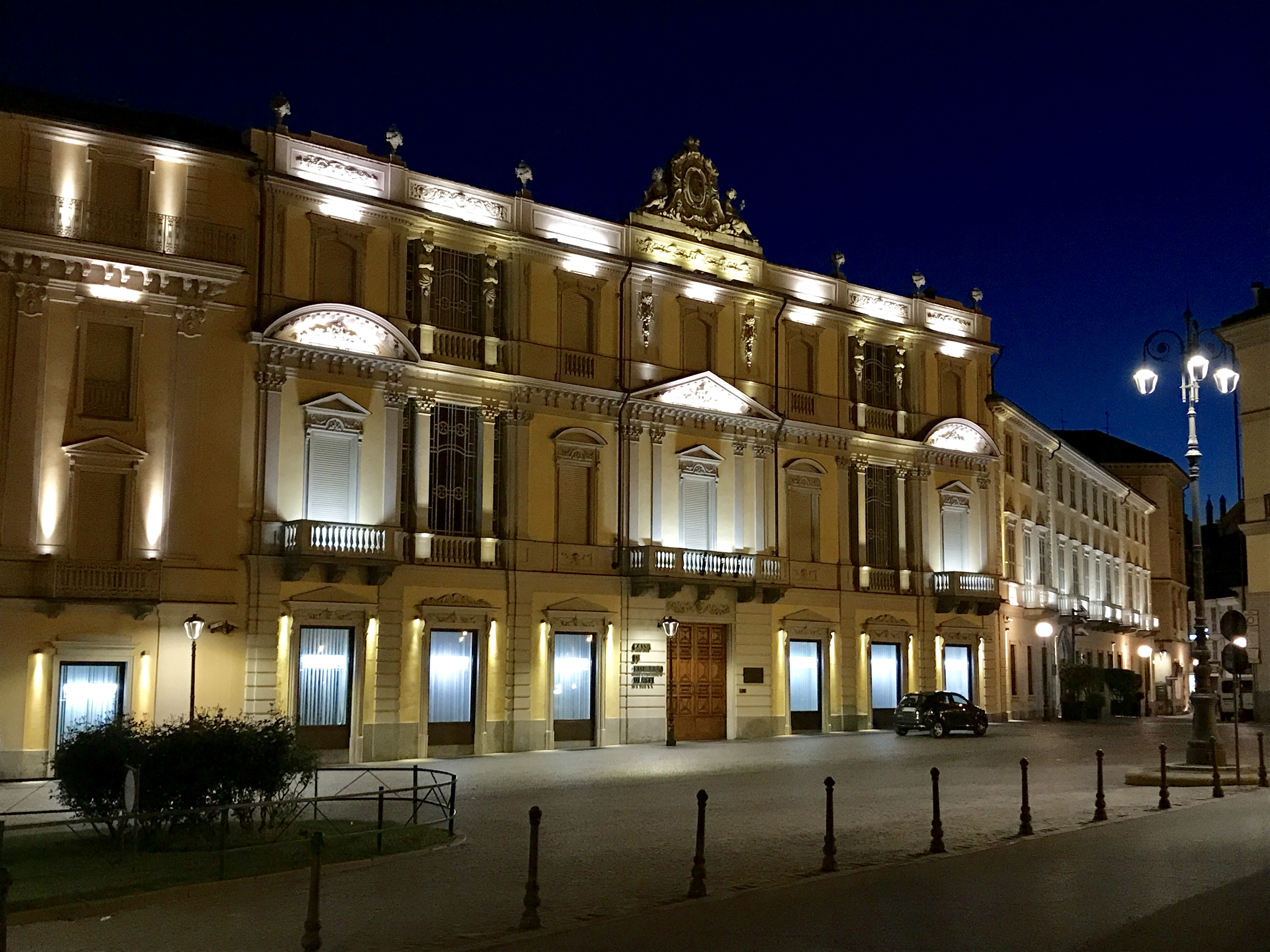
- Headquarters in Asti.
- Trade name: Banca di Asti
- Type: unlisted public S.p.A.
- ISIN: IT0001090783
- Industry: Financial services
- Founded: 25 January 1842 in Asti, the Kingdom of Sardinia
- Headquarters: 23 Piazza Libertà, Asti, Italy
- Area served: Piedmont, Lombardy
- Products: Retail and corporate banking
- Net income: ▼€65.674 million (2014)
- Total assets: €13.012 billion (2024)
- Total equity: ▼€624.299 million (2014)
Owner
Fondazione CR Asti	(31.80%)
Banco BPM	(9.99%)
general public	(48.45%)
treasury share	(0.08%)
- Subsidiaries: Biverbanca (60.42%); Immobiliare Maristella (100%)
- Capital ratio: 10.70% (Tier 1)
- Website: bancacrasti.it

Cassa di Risparmio di Asti known as Banca CR Asti or just Banca di Asti, is an Italian saving bank based in Asti, Piedmont. It serves Piedmont and Lombardy regions.

== History ==
The bank was founded on 25 January 1842 in Asti, in the Kingdom of Sardinia. Due to Legge Amato, on 24 June 1992 the bank was split into Cassa di Risparmio di Asti S.p.A. and Fondazione Cassa di Risparmio di Asti (gazetted on 17 July). In 1996 the banking foundation sold part of the shares to private citizens. In 1999 a further 20% was sold to the Deutsche Bank (via its subsidiary Deutsche Bank S.p.A.), which was acquired by Banca Popolare di Milano (via subsidiary Banca di Legnano) in 2004, for €93 million. The banking foundation retained 51.05% shares prior to the 2008 capital increase. Prior to the 2013 capital increases, the banking foundation held 50.45% shares, which was decreased to 50.42% on 28 March 2013. The ownership was further diluted due to another capital increase in 2015.

In December 2012 the bank acquired 60.42% shares of Cassa di Risparmio di Biella e Vercelli, another Piedmontese bank, from Banca Monte dei Paschi di Siena for €206 million, and the remaining shares in 2018, thus finalising the acquisition of BiverBanca, which was then incorporated in Banca di Asti in 2021.

== Subsidiary ==
- Cassa di Risparmio di Biella e Vercelli (Biverbanca)

== See also ==
other bank of the provincial capital of Piedmont

- Cassa di Risparmio di Alessandria, now part of Banco BPM
- Cassa di Risparmio di Cuneo, now part of UBI Banca
- Cassa di Risparmio di Torino, now part of UniCredit
