= Banca Carim =

- Native name: Banca Carim – Cassa di Risparmio di Rimini S.p.A.
- Type: Subsidiary (legally incorporated as società per azioni)
- Industry: Financial services
- Founded: 1840; 1992 (as S.p.A.)
- Defunct: 2018
- Fate: absorbed into the parent company
- Headquarters: Rimini, Italy
- Number of locations: 68 (2016)
- Area served: Emilia-Romagna; Marche; Umbria; Lazio
- Services: Retail banking
- Net income: ▼ (€73 million) (2016)
- Total assets: ▼€3,137 million (2016)
- Total equity: ▼€161 million (2016)
- Owner: Crédit Agricole Italia
- Capital ratio: ▼6.91% (CET1, Dec.2016)
- Website: www.bancacarim.it

Banca Carim – Cassa di Risparmio di Rimini S.p.A. was an Italian savings bank based in Rimini, Emilia-Romagna. The bank mainly active in the area around Rimini.

== History ==
The bank was found in 1840 as Cassa di Risparmio di Rimini (Carim in short). Due to Legge Amato, the bank was split into a società per azioni (company limited by shares) and a banking foundation (Fondazione Cassa di Risparmio di Rimini). In 2013, the bank absorbed Banca Etica Adriatica, a bank specialise in ethical banking. The bank had a market share of 22.01% in deposits in the province of Rimini.

In 2016, the plan to recapitalize €100 million was announced. As a consequence of the Supervisory Review and Evaluation Process of the Bank of Italy, the capital ratios requirement on Carim was increased to 7.80% (CET1), 9.30% (Tier 1) and 11.30% (Total) respectively, causing the bank to recapitalise. The bank Tier 1 Capital Ratio and Total Capital Ratio stood at 8.53% and 10.86% at 31 December 2015.

On 13 September 2016 the ordinary shareholders' meeting of the bank approved the proposal of suing the former management team of the bank for faults during 2007 to 2010.

In 2017 it was announced that Crédit Agricole Italia has been interested to acquire the bank, which a process of due diligence was started in the same year. A contract was signed on 29 September, with Fondo Interbancario di Tutela dei Depositi voluntary scheme, which was responsible to recapitalize and clean up the non-performing loans before handover.

== Shareholders ==
As of 31 December 2016, the banking foundation Fondazione Cassa di Risparmio di Rimini still owned 56% shares as the largest shareholder. Other notable shareholders were Fondazione Cassa di Risparmio di Fano which owned 0.18% shares, as well as fellow banks Nuova Cassa di Risparmio di Ferrara (0.37968%) and Cassa di Risparmio di Cento.

In 2018, it was announced that the bank would be absorbed into Crédit Agricole Italia, ending its history as a separate entity.

== See also ==
- Cassa dei Risparmi di Forlì e della Romagna, another Romagna bank
- Cassa di Risparmio di Cesena, another Romagna bank
- Cassa di Risparmio di Ravenna, another Romagna bank
- List of banks in Italy
