= Fondazione Cariverona =

Italian banking foundation

Fondazione Cassa di Risparmio di Verona, Vicenza, Belluno e Ancona, also known as Fondazione Cariverona, is an Italian banking foundation based in Verona, Veneto region. The foundation was created in 1991.

== History ==
Due to the Legge Amato, a law that required banks to become companies limited by shares (Italian: società per azioni). The bank Cassa di Risparmio di Verona, Vicenza, Belluno e Ancona (Cariverona) spin off the banking activities to form Cariverona Banca S.p.A., with the original statutory corporation and legal person was renamed into Fondazione Cassa di Risparmio di Verona, Vicenza, Belluno e Ancona. It was approved by The Decree of the Ministry of the Treasury on 20 December 1991 and the Decree was gazetted on 24 January 1992. The foundation retained its membership at Associazione di Casse di Risparmio (ACRI), which was renamed into Associazione di Fondazioni e di Casse di Risparmio S.p.A. after the 1990s banking reform.

The foundation later formed an intermediate holding company with the fellow banking foundation, the Fondazione Cassamarca, the owner of the savings bank Cassa di Risparmio della Marca Trivigiana (Cassamarca). It was the birth of Unicredito, one of the predecessors of UniCredit (formerly called Unicredito Italiano). Unicredito merged with Credito Italiano in 1998 to form Unicredito Italiano.

In the past, it was reported that the foundation had a tie with the political party Lega Nord and had an influence on the resignation of UniCredit's CEO Alessandro Profumo in 2010. At that time, the foundation owned 4.6% shares of the bank. As at 31 December 2010, Fondazione Cariverona was the fourth largest shareholder of UniCredit.

In 2015, Giovanni Battista Alberti, a statutory auditor of UniCredit (Italian: Collegio Sindacale, similar to the audit committee, but not a member of the board of directors), resigned from his position. It was reported that Alberti also linked to the foundation. His role at the bank was originally ended in 2016. Alberti himself is a Province of Verona native, a university professor, a charter accountant, and auditor.

Also in 2015, the foundation signed a deal with the Ministry of Economy and Finance, to diversify its investment, especially from UniCredit. It was reported that the foundation was interested to invest in Italy's popolare banks, which were about to be merged due to another banking reform. However, the foundation bought the minority stake of the listed co-op insurer Cattolica Assicurazioni from Banca Popolare di Vicenza (BPVi) in April 2017, instead of buying any stake of popolare banks. Soon after, BPVi was taken over by the government due to bankruptcy. The foundation sold part of their stake in Cattolica in November 2019.

The stake of the foundation at UniCredit was diluted again by the 2017 cash call. As at 31 December 2017, the foundation only owned 1.8% stake of the bank.

As at 31 December 2018, the foundation was a minority shareholder of UniCredit, as well as in Cattolica Assicurazioni, doBank, A4 Holding (a company that owned the concession of Brescia–Verona–Vicenza–Padua section of Autostrada A4) and Aeroporto Valerio Catullo di Verona Villafranca (the operator of the airport of the same name).

== Protection of historical buildings ==
The foundation is active in the real estate sector, it purchased ancient buildings, such as Palazzo Forti as well as the Palazzo del Capitanio from the comune government. The latter was being restored from 2013 to 2018.

The foundation was also involved in the restoration of the Verona Arena.

== Arts ==
The savings bank before the 1990s split had made a few arts purchases. The banking foundation inherited the collection as well as published several arts books on the behalf of other book publishings, such as an exhibition catalogue.

From 2000 to 2005, the foundation was a sponsor of Biblioteca Civica di Belluno, located in Palazzo Crepadona, Belluno. The palace held the exhibition Marco Ricci e il paesaggio veneto del Settecento in 1993.
