= Cassa di Risparmio di Vignola =

Italian bank

Banca CRV – Cassa di Risparmio di Vignola S.p.A.
- Trade name: Banca CRV
- Company type: subsidiary of a listed company
- Industry: Financial services
- Predecessor: Cassa di Risparmio di Vignola
- Founded: 4 August 1872 (predecessor); 20 December 1991 (S.p.A. & foundation spin-off)
- Defunct: 29 November 2010 (S.p.A. only)
- Fate: absorbed into BPER
- Successor: Fondazione di Vignola (charity only); local branches of BPER
- Headquarters: Vignola, Italy
- Owner: Banca Popolare dell'Emilia Romagna (100%)
- Parent: Banca Popolare dell'Emilia Romagna

Cassa di Risparmio di Vignola was an Italian saving bank based in Vignola, in the Province of Modena, Emilia–Romagna region. It was absorbed by Banca Popolare dell'Emilia Romagna in 2010.

== History ==
Cassa di Risparmio di Vignola (the saving bank of Vignola) was founded on 4 August 1872. Soon after it merged with Cassa di Risparmio di Spilamberto. Due to Legge Amato, the bank was split into Banca CRV – Cassa di Risparmio di Vignola S.p.A. (a limited company) and Fondazione Cassa di Risparmio di Vignola (a banking foundation; now known as Fondazione di Vignola) on 20 December 1991 (gazetted on 24 January 1992).

The foundation sold the majority interests in the company, to Banca Popolare dell'Emilia Romagna (BPER) in late 1990s. In 2000, BPER owned 76.087% shares. The remain 23.913% shares was sold by the foundation to BPER in 2005, for about €33 million.

On 29 November 2010 the bank was absorbed into the parent company.

== Banking foundation ==
The former owner of the bank, Fondazione di Vignola, still runs as a charity organization.

== See also ==
- Cassa di Risparmio di Modena, a predecessor of UniCredit
- Cassa di Risparmio di Carpi, a defunct subsidiary of UniCredit from the Province of Modena
- Cassa di Risparmio di Mirandola, a defunct subsidiary of Intesa Sanpaolo from the Province of Modena
- List of banks in Italy
