= Banco di Sardegna =

Coordinates: 40°43′34″N 8°33′55″E

Banco di Sardegna S.p.A.
- Type: Public
- Industry: Banking
- Founded: 1953
- Headquarters: Sassari, Italy
- Products: Banking, Financial services
- Number of employees: 3374 (June 30, 2008)
- Website: bancosardegna.it

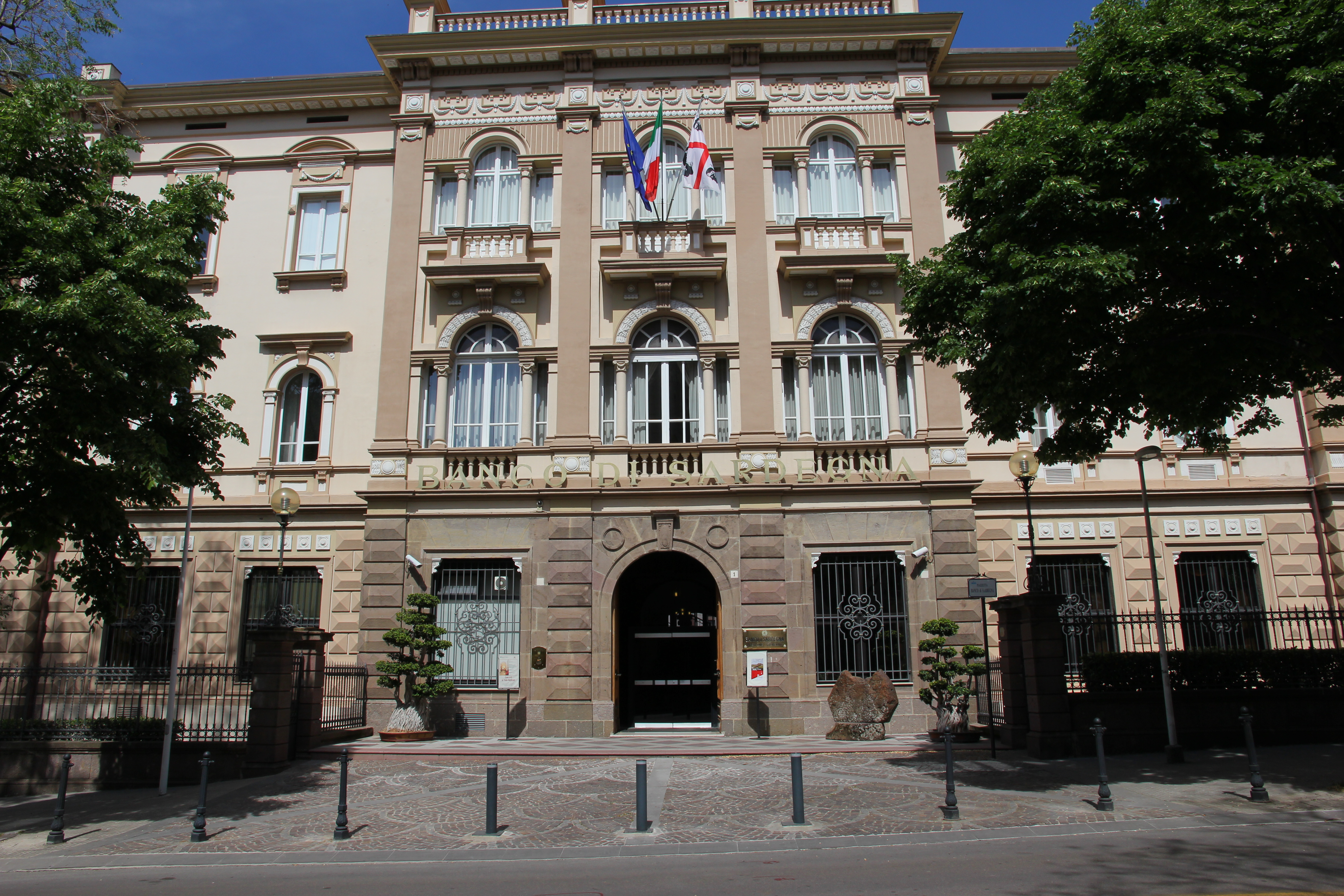
Banco di Sardegna's headquarter and Presidency in Sassari

The Banco di Sardegna S.p.A. (English: Bank of Sardinia) is a bank headquartered in Sassari, Italy and operating primarily on the island of Sardinia, with offices also in Lombardy, Tuscany, Emilia-Romagna, Liguria and Lazio. The bank is a subsidiary of Banca Popolare dell'Emilia Romagna and previously Fondazione Banco di Sardegna.

The general manager and the presidency is located in Sassari, while the registered office is settled in Cagliari.

The bank has got a Social capital of 155,247,762.00 Euros and a Balance Sheet Total of 12.480 Billion Euros (December 30, 2007). It is quoted to Milan Stock Exchange.

== History ==
Banco di Sardegna was founded in 1944. In 1953 it merged with Istituto di Credito Agrario per la Sardegna (founded 1928)

== Sponsorship ==
It's the main sponsorship of Dinamo Basket Sassari, playing in Lega Basket Serie A.
