= Cassa di Risparmio di Orvieto =

CariOrvieto
- Native name: Cassa di Risparmio di Orvieto S.p.A.
- Company type: subsidiary of a public company
- Industry: Financial services
- Founded: 1852
- Headquarters: 21 Piazza della Repubblica, Orvieto, Italy
- Number of locations: 54 branches (2015)
- Services: Retail and corporate banking
- Net income: ▼ (€6,608,026) (2015)
- Total assets: ▲€1,323,615,860 (2015)
- Total equity: ▼€114,343,063 (2015)
- Owner: Banca del Mezzogiorno – MedioCredito Centrale
- Parent: Banca del Mezzogiorno – MedioCredito Centrale
- Capital ratio: 10.59% (CET1)
- Website: cariorvieto.it
- Footnotes / references in separate financial statements

Cassa di Risparmio di Orvieto S.p.A. is an Italian bank based in Orvieto, in the Province of Terni, Umbria.

== History ==
Cassa di Risparmio di Orvieto was found in 1863, just two years after the unification of Italy. In December 1991, the statutory corporation was split into a limited company (Italian: Società per Azioni) and Ente Cassa di Risparmio di Orvieto. The limited company was acquired by Banca CR Firenze in late 1990s and then Banca Popolare di Bari in 2009. Between the two owners, Intesa Sanpaolo also owned the bank from 2007 to 2009 via Banca CR Firenze.

In 2020, following the bailout of Banca Popolare di Bari, Banca del Mezzogiorno – MedioCredito Centrale took the control of Cassa di Risparmio di Orvieto.

== See also ==
- Banca dell'Umbria
- Casse di Risparmio dell'Umbria
