= Cassa di Risparmio di Cesena =

Defunct Italian savings bank

- Trade name: CRC; Carisp Cesena; CR Cesena
- Formerly: Unibanca (from 1999 to 2010)
- Type: subsidiary (legally as società per Azioni)
- ISIN: IT0000470911
- Industry: Financial services
- Founded: 22 December 1841 in Cesena; 1991 (Foundation and S.p.A. split)
- Defunct: 2018
- Fate: absorbed into the parent company
- Headquarters: Cesena, Italy
- Area served: Emilia-Romagna, Veneto, Marche, Tuscany and Umbria region
- Key people: Carmine Lamanda (Chairman); Bruno Bossina (GM and Director)
- Services: Retail banking
- Net income: ▲ (€65 million) (2016)
- Total assets: ▼€3,749 million (2016)
- Total equity: ▲€322 million (2016)
- Owners: Crédit Agricole Italia
- Parent: Crédit Agricole Italia
- Divisions: Banca di Romagna
- Capital ratio: ▲10.04% (Group CET1, Dec.2016)
- Website: www.carispcesena.it

Cassa di Risparmio di Cesena S.p.A. also known as Carisp Cesena in short, was an Italian savings bank based in Cesena, in the province of Forlì-Cesena, Emilia-Romagna region.

The bank had branches mostly in Emilia-Romagna region (87%; Forlì-Cesena province: 39, Ravenna 35, Rimini 10, Bologna 10, Modena 3, Ferrara 3, Reggio Emilia 2) However it also had 5 branches in Marche (2 in Ancona, 3 in Pesaro-Urbino), Umbria (province of Perugia 3), Tuscany (Arezzo province 3) and Veneto (Padova 2, Rovigo 1).

== History ==
Cassa di Risparmio di Cesena was found in 1841 in Cesena, the Papal States by 105 private citizens, two year after fellow saving bank in Forlì who found by a decree of Pope Gregory XVI.

In 1991, due to Italian banking reform, the organization was split into Fondazione Cassa di Risparmio di Cesena, as the owner of the bank and a philanthropic organization, and Cassa di Risparmio di Cesena S.p.A., a Società per azioni which operates as a bank (P.IVA 02155830405). On 1 January 1999, the owner of Carisp Cesena and Banca di Romagna, forming a new holding company Unibanca for the two banks. The new banking group cover the whole Emilia-Romagna region. Unibanca, actually was the renaming of [old] Cassa di Risparmio di Cesena S.p.A., with a new subsidiary of the same name (Cassa di Risparmio di Cesena S.p.A.) was also incorporated (P.IVA 02626170407) on 5 August 1998.

On 4 October 2010 Carisp Cesena was absorbed by the holding company Unibanca, with Unibanca revered to use the old name "Cassa di Risparmio di Cesena S.p.A.". In 2013, Banca di Romagna was also absorbed by Carisp Cesena, but retained as a banking division.

As of 31 December 2014, the original owner of the bank still held 48.027% of the shares, followed by former owner of Banca di Romagna, the banking foundations from Lugo (11.575%) and Faenza (6.462%), both from the province of Ravenna; Banca Popolare di Puglia e Basilicata owned 0.20% stake.

In 2016, after the 2015 financial statements of the bank was approved by the board of directors (which saw the banking group CET1 Ratio had decreased to just 1.63% at 31 December 2015), a capital increase of €280 million was announced, which was reserved to voluntary scheme of Fondo Interbancario di Tutela dei Depositi. The banking foundations received free warrants to subscribe additional new shares.

Eventually FITD owned 95.3% of the share capital after the capital increase. In 2017 it was announced that Crédit Agricole Italia has interested to acquire the bank, which a process of due diligence was started in the same year. A contract was signed on 29 September 2017, with FITD voluntary scheme was responsible to recapitalize and clean up the non-performing loans before handover.

In 2018, it was announced that the bank would be absorbed into Crédit Agricole Italia, ending its history as a separate entity.

== See also ==
- Fondazione Cassa di Risparmio di Cesena
  - Art collection of Fondazione Cassa di Risparmio di Cesena
- Carisport, a venue named after the bank
- Cassa dei Risparmi di Forlì e della Romagna, another bank from the province of Forlì-Cesena
- Cassa di Risparmio di Ravenna, another bank from Romagna region
- Banca Carim - another bank from Romagna region
- List of banks in Italy
