= Cassa di Risparmio di Saluzzo =

- Trade name: C.R. Saluzzo
- Company type: subsidiary of a listed company
- Founded: 1901
- Headquarters: Saluzzo, Italy
- Number of locations: 27 branches (2015)
- Area served: Piedmont
- Net income: ▲€2,636,595 (2014)
- Total assets: ▼€1,099,982,917 (2014)
- Total equity: ▲€78,093,087 (2014)
- Owner: BPER Banca (100%)
- Parent: BPER Banca
- Website: www.crsaluzzo.it

Cassa di Risparmio di Saluzzo was an Italian saving bank. The bank was based in Saluzzo, in the Province of Cuneo, Piedmont.

Since the bank reforms in 1991, the bank was split into a società per azioni and a non-profit banking foundation. Cassa di Risparmio di Torino (Banca CRT) once became a minority shareholders of the bank. However its successor, UniCredit sold their possession on Saluzzo (31.019%), Bra (31.021%), Fossano (23.077%) and Savigliano (31.006%) to Banca Popolare dell'Emilia Romagna for about €149 million in 2006. (which BPER paid €45.384 million for CR Saluzzo's shares)

As at 31 December 2014 the foundation owned 66.98%, followed by BPER 31.019% and Argentario 2%.

In 2016 a plan to purchase the controlling stake from the foundation was announced. It was part of a reform in banking foundation, forcing them to diversify investments. In December BPER purchased an additional 20% of the bank to completely privatized CR Saluzzo.

In March 2020, BPER Banca decided to absorb Cassa di Risparmio di Saluzzo S.p.A. (CR Saluzzo), through a merger by incorporation that took effect on 27 July 2020.

== See also ==
- Cassa di Risparmio di Cuneo
