= BPER Banca =

Italian banking group

BPER Banca S.p.A.
- Formerly: Banca Popolare dell'Emilia; Banca Popolare dell'Emilia Romagna
- Type: Società per Azioni
- Traded as: BIT: BPE; FTSE MIB Component
- ISIN: IT0000066123
- Industry: Financial services
- Predecessor: Banca Popolare di Modena; Banca Cooperativa di Bologna; Banca Popolare di Cesena
- Founded: 1867 (BP Modena); 1984 (BP Emilia); 1 May 1992 (BPER)
- Headquarters: Modena, Italy
- Number of locations: 2,046 branches in Italy
- Area served: Italy
- Key people: Gianni Franco Papa (CEO), Fabio Cerchiai (Chairman)
- Services: Retail and corporate banking, insurance
- Revenue: ▲€6.589 billion (2025)
- Net income: ▲€1.818 billion (2025)
- Total assets: ▲€204.650 billion (2025)
- Total equity: ▲€16.565 billion (2025)
- Number of employees: 22,259 (2025)
- Subsidiaries: Banco di Sardegna; Bibanca; Banca Cesare Ponti; BPER Bank Luxembourg
- Capital ratio: 14.83% (CET1, 2025)
- Website: bper.it
- Footnotes; Revenue is net operating income (proventi operativi netti); net income is attributable to the parent company; equity is attributable to the parent company. On a consolidated basis.

BPER Banca S.p.A., formerly known as Banca Popolare dell'Emilia Romagna S.C., is an Italian banking group offering traditional banking services to individuals, corporate and public entities. The company is based in Modena and is a constituent of the FTSE MIB index. At 31 December 2025 the group had 2,046 branches in Italy, 494 of them from Banca Popolare di Sondrio, plus 21 branches of Banca Popolare di Sondrio (Suisse) and a branch in Luxembourg. The bank is a majority shareholder of the Piedmontese bank Cassa di Risparmio di Bra and Saluzzo, as well as a minority shareholder of Fossano and Savigliano. BPER has been designated as a Significant Institution since the entry into force of European Banking Supervision in late 2014, and as a consequence is directly supervised by the European Central Bank.

== History ==
Banca Popolare dell'Emilia was formed in 1984 by the merger of Banca Popolare di Modena (founded in 1867) with Banca Cooperativa di Bologna. The bank merged with Banca Popolare di Cesena to form Banca Popolare dell'Emilia Romagna on 1 May 1992. The bank acquired and absorbed many provincial and regional-level community banks (Italian: Banca Popolare) and savings banks (Italian: Cassa di Risparmio) from the 1990s to the 2010s.

=== 2000s ===
In 2005, Cassa di Risparmio di Vignola was privatized for about €33 million. The remaining 23.913% of shares were sold by the banking foundation. In 2006, the minority interests in Cassa di Risparmio di Bra, Fossano, Saluzzo and Savigliano were acquired from UniCredit for about €149 million.

=== 2010s ===
In February 2013, BPER acquired an additional 35.98% stake of CR Bra S.p.A. from the banking foundation of CR Bra for around €23.9 million. After the deal, BPER owned a 67% stake. The bank was affected by Decree-Law N°3 of 2015, which required banks with assets of more than €8 billion to transform from cooperative societies (S.C.) to Società per Azioni (from one person one vote to one share one vote).

In 2016, the controlling stake in Cassa di Risparmio di Saluzzo was acquired from the banking foundation of CR Saluzzo. On 14 July 2016 a gross value of €450 million of bad loans was sold to the Algebris NPL Fund and Cerberus European Investments without recourse. Italian banks had the highest gross NPLs to total loan ratio in the European Union (18% at 31 December 2015); BPER Group's gross NPLs to total loan ratio was 23.28% at 31 December 2015, or €11.395 billion; Banco di Sardegna alone had €2 billion, as well as the highest ratio in the group.

In late 2016 the bank was re-incorporated as BPER Banca S.p.A. As part of the mandatory process, the bank offered to buy back shares for €3.8070, based on the historical price of the bank. However, no share was repurchased, and the market value of the bank on the exchange returned to above that price. On 2 March 2017, BPER Banca signed a contract to acquire Nuova Cassa di Risparmio di Ferrara for a nominal fee of €1; the deal was completed on 30 June. In February 2019, BPER Banca announced the acquisition of Unipol Banca from Unipol and UnipolSai. The takeover was completed in July 2019 and on 25 November 2019, Unipol Banca was merged into BPER Banca.

=== 2020s ===
In 2020, BPER entered into an agreement with Intesa Sanpaolo to acquire 532 branches the latter had to shed as a result of regulatory obligations resulting from its acquisition of rival UBI Banca. In February 2022, BPER Banca agreed to take over Banca Carige; the acquisition of a 79.418% stake was completed on 3 June 2022 and Carige was merged into BPER on 28 November 2022.

On 6 February 2025, BPER Banca launched a €4.3bn takeover bid for Banca Popolare di Sondrio. At the end of the offer period, shares tendered represented 58.15% of Sondrio's capital, taking BPER, with its existing holding, to 58.49% and control of the Lombard lender; after the offer was reopened from 21 to 25 July 2025, BPER reached 80.69%. The boards of BPER Banca and Banca Popolare di Sondrio approved the merger by absorption on 5 November 2025, and the shareholders' meetings on 12 March 2026; the merger deed was signed on 13 April and the merger took effect on 20 April 2026.

On 9 October 2026, the ECB and the Bank of Italy authorized Unipol to exceed 20% of BPER's share capital and to acquire de facto control of the bank. In the context of Intesa Sanpaolo's offer for Banca Monte dei Paschi di Siena, 635 MPS branches may be transferred to the BPER group through Unipol; on 5 November 2026 CEO Gianni Franco Papa said BPER expects to receive Unipol's proposal between the first and second quarter of 2028 and that no negotiations had yet begun.

== Former subsidiaries ==
- ABF Factoring (2004–2010)
- Banca della Campania (2003–2014)
- Banca del Monte di Foggia (1998–2006)
- Banca Popolare di Aprilia (1998–?)
- Banca Popolare di Castrovillari e Corigliano Calabro (1999–?)
- Banca Popolare di Crotone (?–2008)
- Banca Popolare dell'Irpinia (2000–2013)
- Banca Popolare di Lanciano e Sulmona (1962–2003)
- Banca Popolare del Materano (?–2008)
- Banca Popolare del Mezzogiorno (2008–2014)
- Banca Popolare di Salerno (?–2003)
- Banca Popolare di Sinni (1998–?)
- Banca Popolare di Ravenna (?–2014)
- Meliorbanca (?–2012)
- Cassa di Risparmio della Provincia dell'Aquila (1999–2013)
- Cassa di Risparmio di Vignola (?–2010)
- Credito Commerciale Tirreno (1997–2003)
- Eurobanca del Trentino (2004–2010)
- Nuova Cassa di Risparmio di Ferrara (2017–2017)
- Cassa di Risparmio di Bra (2013–2020)
- Cassa di Risparmio di Saluzzo (2014–2020)
- Unipol Banca (2019–2019)
- Banca Carige (2022–2022)
- Banca Popolare di Sondrio (2025–2026)

== Equity interests ==
- Arca Holding (57.061%)
- Cassa di Risparmio di Fossano (23.077%)
- Banca Cassa di Risparmio di Savigliano (31.006%)

== Shareholders ==
As of 23 October 2026

Shareholder	Stake (% of ordinary shares)
Unipol	20.0%
Fondazione di Sardegna	7.4%
JPMorgan Chase	5.9%
BlackRock	4.8%
Other shareholders	61.9%

JPMorgan and BlackRock holdings are as notified on 14 October and 25 September 2026 respectively; JPMorgan also reported a further 2.94% in financial instruments, and BlackRock 0.22%.

== See also ==
- Art collection of Banca Popolare dell'Emilia Romagna
- List of banks in the euro area
- List of banks in Italy
