= Cassa di Risparmio di Bra =

- Trade name: CR Bra
- Type: subsidiary of a listed company
- Founded: 1763 (Mount of Piety); 7 July 1842
- Headquarters: Bra, Italy
- Net income: ▼ (€9,917,520) (2014)
- Total assets: ▼€1,443,372,657 (2014)
- Total equity: ▼€66,750,151 (2014)
- Owner: BPER Banca (84,286%); Fondazione CRB (15,714%)
- Capital ratio: 7.47% (Tier 1)
- Website: www.crbra.it

Cassa di Risparmio di Bra was an Italian regional bank. The bank was based in Bra, in the Province of Cuneo, Piedmont.

Due to Legge Amato, the bank was split into a società per azioni and a non-profit banking foundation on 20 December 1991 (gazetted on 18 January 1992). Cassa di Risparmio di Torino (Banca CRT) once became a minority shareholders of the bank. However its successor, UniCredit sold their possession on Bra (31.021%), Fossano (23.077%), Saluzzo (31.019%) and Savigliano (31.006%) to Banca Popolare dell'Emilia Romagna for about €149 million in 2006. (which BPER paid €32.827 million for CR Bra's shares) In February 2013, BPER acquired an additional 35.98% shares from the foundation for around €23.9 million. After the deal BPER owned 67% shares.

In March 2020, BPER Banca decided to absorb Cassa di Risparmio di Bra (CR Bra), through a merger by incorporation that took effect on 27 July 2020 .

== See also ==
- Cassa di Risparmio di Cuneo
