= Cassa di Risparmio di Calabria e Lucania =

Carical
- Native name: Cassa di Risparmio di Calabria e Lucania S.p.A.
- Formerly: Cassa di Risparmio di Calabria e di Lucania
- Company type: subsidiary
- Industry: Financial services
- Founded: 1861 (Carical); 1992 (Carical S.p.A.)
- Defunct: 31 December 1997
- Fate: merged with Caripuglia and Carisal
- Successor: Carical Foundation; Banca Carime
- Headquarters: Cosenza, Italy
- Services: Retail banking
- Owner: Cariplo (49.47%); Caripuglia (2.08%); Carisal (0.02%); Carical Foundation (37.5%)
- Footnotes / references 1996 data

Cassa di Risparmio di Calabria e Lucania S.p.A. (Carical) was an Italian bank based in Cosenza, Calabria. The bank was merged with other banks to form Banca Carime.

== History ==
Cassa di Risparmio di Calabria was found on 24 September 1861. The bank later extended to Lucania (Basilicata region), as Cassa di Risparmio di Calabria e di Lucania. From March 1987 to July 1988 the bank was under special administration by the state, which was recapitalized later.

In 1992 the bank formed a new subsidiary Cassa di Risparmio di Calabria e Lucania S.p.A. (company limited by shares), with the original statutory corporation became Fondazione Cassa di Risparmio di Calabria e di Lucania, a banking foundation. The bank was 50% owned by the foundation and 50% other shareholders (Banca CRT 16.7%, Cariplo 16.7%, ICCRI, Caripuglia, Sicilcassa and others). However, a new sub-holding Fincarical was incorporated, which the foundation and Cariplo transferred their stake into the sub-holding in a 75-25 ratio.

A recapitalization of the bank was also planned immediately: 160 billion lire (share premium reserve increased 80 billion and share capital increased from 240 to 320 billion), which Fincarical also recapitalized for the same amount (share capital increased from 160 to 240 billion lire; plus 80 billion increase in shares premium reserve) by Cariplo. If the other shareholders did not participated in the capital increase of the bank, the ratio would become Fincarical owned 75% stake, followed by Banca CRT (12.5%), ICCRI (6.25%), Caripuglia, Sicilcassa and others. On 24 February 1994 Fincarical bought Banca CRT's stake, making the sub-holding owned 87.25% stake of Carical . In late 1994 the foundation sold all the share in Fincarical (42.9%) to Cariplo. At the same time the foundation acquired their stake in Carical from Fincarical, making the bank was majority owned by Cariplo (49.8%) and foundation (37.5%) directly.

Circa 1993 the bank had a market share of 16.07% in lending market (short term, year missing) in Basilicata, behind Banca Mediterranea (38.44%) but ahead Banco di Napoli (12.67%).

In 1993 the bank sold the minority interests in ISVEIMER to Banco di Napoli.

In 1996 Cariplo's wholly owned subsidiary Fincarime (ex-Fincarical) owned 49.47% shares of Carical, with an additional 9.61% owned by Cariplo directly, as well as 2.08% and 0.02% stake were held by Caripuglia (Cariplo owned 63.71% stake) and Carisal (Cariplo owned 80% stake) respectively.

In July 1997 Cariplo acquired the remaining shares of the bank from the banking foundation.

On 31 December 1997 Fincarime was renamed into Banca Carime, which Carical, Caripuglia and Carisal started to inject their bank business into the new company. In May 1999, Carical was absorbed by Cariplo.

== Banking foundation ==
Fondazione Cassa di Risparmio di Calabria e di Lucania is a charity organization based in Cosenza, Calabria. It was the parent company of the bank in 1992, due to the spin off of the banking activities as a separate Società per Azioni. However, since the foundation sold the bank in 1997, as well as the bank was absorbed by UBI Banca in 2017, the foundation became the only heir of the original banking-charity entity that formed in 1861. As at 31 December 2016, the foundation had a stakeholders' equity of €80 million.

The foundation was the minority shareholder of Cassa Depositi e Prestiti and CDP Reti. Some of the assets of the foundation was managed by UBI Pramerica SGR, a joint venture of UBI Banca and Pramerica Financial, with the foundation only acted as the unit holder in the private equity fund.

== See also ==
- List of banks in Italy
