= Cassa di Risparmio di Fossano =

Italian saving bank

CR Fossano
- Native name: Cassa di Risparmio di Fossano S.p.A.
- Company type: Private società per azioni
- Industry: Financial services
- Founded: 1905
- Headquarters: Fossano, Italy
- Services: Retail banking
- Net income: ▼€6,275,222 (2015)
- Total assets: ▲€1,986,706,904 (2015)
- Total equity: ▼€121,776,950 (2015)
- Owner: Fondazione CR Fossano (76.92%); BPER (23.077%)
- Capital ratio: 9.70% (CET1)
- Website: www.crfossano.it
- Footnotes / references source

Cassa di Risparmio di Fossano is an Italian savings bank based in Fossano, in the province of Cuneo, Piedmont.

Monte di Pietà di Fossano was founded in 1591. In 1905 the bank was formed by the mount of piety. Since the bank reformed in 1991, it was split into a società per azioni and a non-profit banking foundation. Cassa di Risparmio di Torino (Banca CRT) once became a minority shareholder of the bank. However, its successor, UniCredit, sold their possession on Fossano (23.077%), Bra (31.021%), Saluzzo (31.019%) and Savigliano (31.006%) to Banca Popolare dell'Emilia Romagna for about €149 million in 2006 (which BPER paid €36.898 million for CR Fossano's shares).

== See also ==
- Cassa di Risparmio di Cuneo
