= Cassa di Risparmio della Repubblica di San Marino =

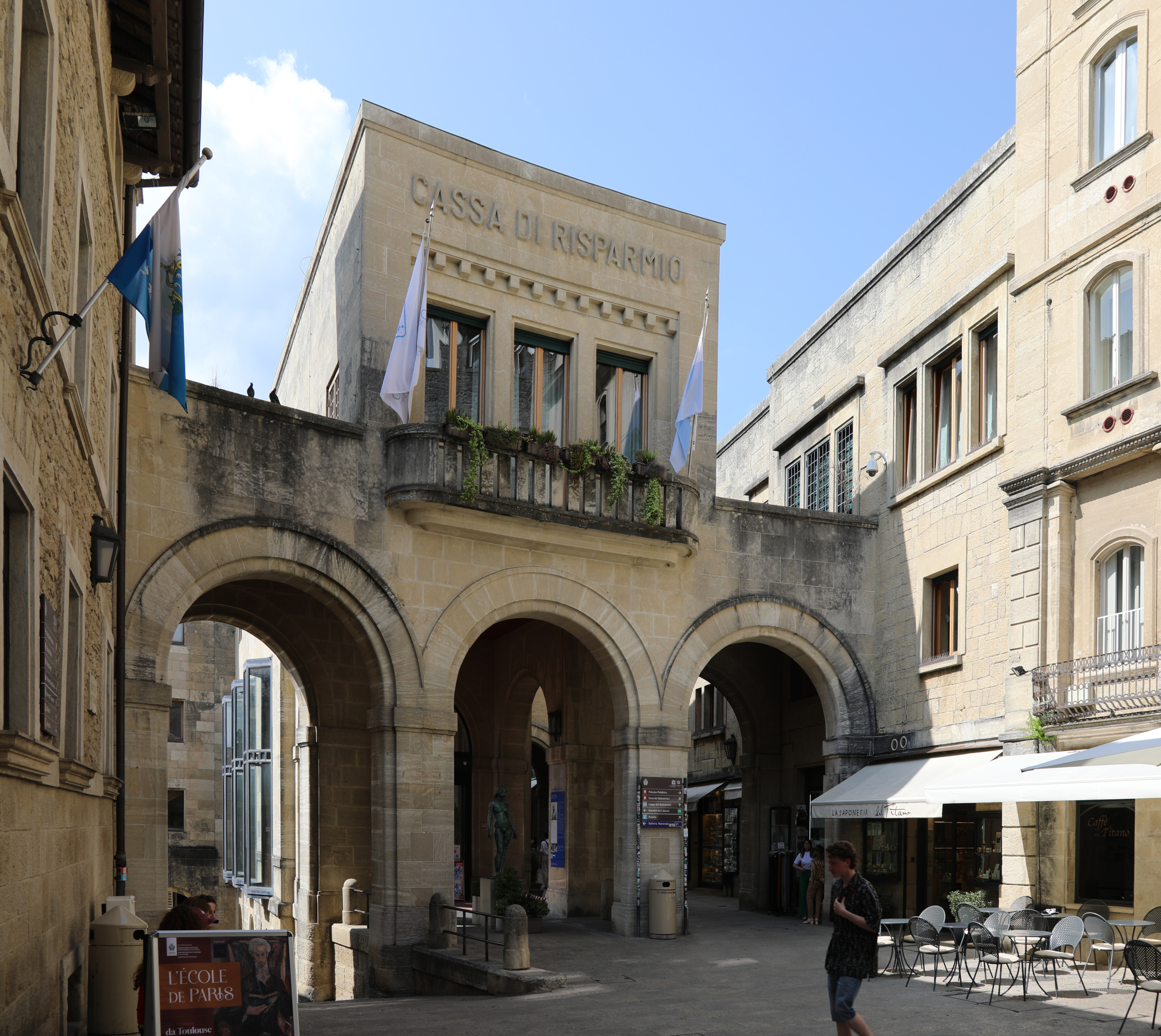
- Type: Società per azioni
- Industry: Financial services
- Founded: 1882
- Founder: S.U.M.S.
- Headquarters: San Marino
- Products: Private banking, wealth management, asset management
- Revenue: € 15,454,000 (2017)
- Net income: € -39,170,000 (2017)
- Total equity: € 100,634,322 (2017)
- Number of employees: 155 (2017)
- Website: www.carisp.sm

Cassa di Risparmio della Repubblica di San Marino is a financial institution based in San Marino. It consists of 16 branches and operates as both a retail and commercial bank for San Marino citizens and as an offshore private bank for non-resident clients. It also owns Kovanica d.d., a bank based in Varaždin, Croatia, which became a subsidiary of the bank as of January 24, 2007.

== History ==
Founded in 1882, it is San Marino's oldest financial institution. With a 2007 net income of €7.2 million, it is San Marino's largest bank.

On July 29, 2008, the bank filed a lawsuit in the English and Welsh High Court against Barclays, seeking damages totaling €170m for the sale of customised securities that carried a higher risk than the bank claimed to have understood. The bank's suit also stated Barclays sold it investments that it ultimately did not need.

In 2009 the bank management was arrested by the Italian police under allegations of money laundering and of unauthorized exercise of banking activity in Italy through its subsidiary company Delta.

In 2016, after a process of asset quality review, the bank recorded a loss of €534 million in its balance sheet, mostly related to its participation in Delta which had been put in special administration by the Bank of Italy after the 2009 facts. As the loss would have made it impossible for the bank to respect the mandatory capital requirements, the government allowed the bank to distribute the loss in a period of 25 years. The overall loss is approximately equal to 30% of the country's GDP and the IMF estimates that its coverage will bring the government's debt-to-GDP ratio from 22% to around 50%.

As a result of the losses and of the bailout performed by the government, the previous owners' capital participations have been almost completely wiped out. As a result, today, the government of San Marino holds the vast majority of the shares (86.29%), which is projected to furtherly increase in the next years. The banking foundation, which owned 100% of the bank before the economic crisis, now has 13.10% of the bank.
