= Banca Cassa di Risparmio di Savigliano =

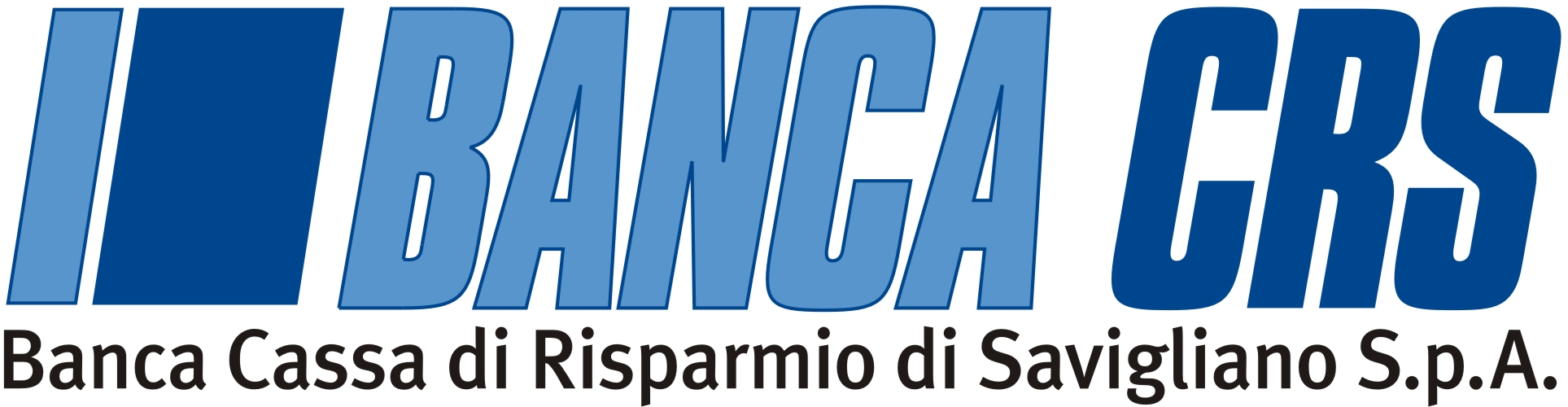
- Trade name: Banca CRS
- Formerly: Cassa di Risparmio di Savigliano
- Founded: 1858
- Headquarters: Savigliano, Italy
- Net income: ▼€2,354,687 (2015)
- Total assets: ▼€1,418,853,235 (2015)
- Total equity: €81,453,213 (2015)
- Owner: Fondazione CR Savigliano (68.994%); BPER Banca (31.006%)
- Capital ratio: 10.10% (CET1)
- Website: www.bancacrs.it

Banca Cassa di Risparmio di Savigliano S.p.A. is an Italian saving bank. The bank was based in Savigliano, in the Province of Cuneo, Piedmont.

Since the bank reforms in 1991, the bank was split into a società per azioni and a non-profit banking foundation. Cassa di Risparmio di Torino (Banca CRT) once became a minority shareholders of the bank. However, its successor, UniCredit sold their possession on Savigliano (31.006%), Bra (31.021%), Fossano (23.077%) and Saluzzo (31.019%) to Banca Popolare dell'Emilia Romagna for about €149 million. (which BPER paid €33.409 million for CR Savigliano's shares)

== See also ==
- Cassa di Risparmio di Cuneo
