= Cassa di Risparmio di Alessandria =

- Company type: subsidiary of a listed company
- Industry: Financial services
- Founded: 1838; 1991 (S.p.A. & Fondazione)
- Defunct: 2012 (S.p.A. only)
- Headquarters: Alessandria, Piedmont, Italy
- Products: Retail banking
- Owner: Fondazione CR Alessandria (1991–2003; majority); Banca Popolare di Milano (2003–2012)
- Parent: Banca Popolare di Milano

Cassa di Risparmio di Alessandria was an Italian regional bank based in Alessandria, Piedmont. It was absorbed into the parent company Banca Popolare di Milano in 2012.

The former owner of the bank, Fondazione Cassa di Risparmio di Alessandria, still operates as a charity organization.

== History ==
Founded on 21 August 1838, at that time still in Kingdom of Sardinia. The daily banking operation and ownership were split into a società per azioni and Fondazione Cassa di Risparmio di Alessandria in 1991. Istituto Mobiliare Italiano also subscribed the capital increase of the bank for 23 billion lire (15.330 billion lire increase in share capital), owning 11.33% stake after the deal. In 1995, the bank was merged with the saving banks (Italian: Cassa di Risparmio) from Spezia and Carrara to form "Carinord Holding" (acronym of Ca.Ri. North), which the former owners of the banks (the foundations) as well as Cassa di Risparmio delle Provincie Lombarde (Cariplo) were the new shareholders of the holding company, despite the three banks remains as separate subsidiaries. In 2002 CR Alessandria was break away from the union, which Foundation CR Alessandria and Cariplo were the major shareholders of the bank (80%) through "Carinord 1 SpA", a 50-50 joint venture. The foundation held 20% directly, thus held 60% shares directly and indirectly in total. In 2003 Intesa Sanpaolo (ex-Cariplo) sold its shares on the bank to Banca Popolare di Milano. At the same time the foundation held a minority shares of Banca Popolare di Milano and some of its subsidiaries, as well as retained the 20% shares on CR Alessandria. On 11 February 2012 the bank was absorbed by Banca di Legnano, a wholly owned subsidiary of Banca Popolare di Milano, despite Banca di Legnano was absorbed also in 2013.

CR Alessandria was the minority shareholders of Cassa di Risparmio di Tortona which acquired from Cassa di Risparmio di Torino. Due to 2003 transactions, the shares of Tortona was owned by the foundation of CR Alessandria instead.

== Bank Foundation ==
Fondazione Cassa di Risparmio di Alessandria still operates as a charity organization. In 2006 the foundation sold the minority shares holding in Cassa di Risparmio di Tortona to Banca Regionale Europea, a subsidiary of Banca Lombarda e Piemontese for €38.5 million. As of 31 December 2013, the foundation had an equity of €311,593,557. The foundation held a minority shares holding in Cassa Depositi e Prestiti for 39,932 shares, as well as 0.506% of Banca Popolare di Milano.

== See also ==
- Alessandria Challenger, a tennis tournament sponsored by the bank
- List of banks in Italy
