= Cassa di Risparmio di Torino =

Italian savings bank based in Turin, Piedmont

Banca CRT

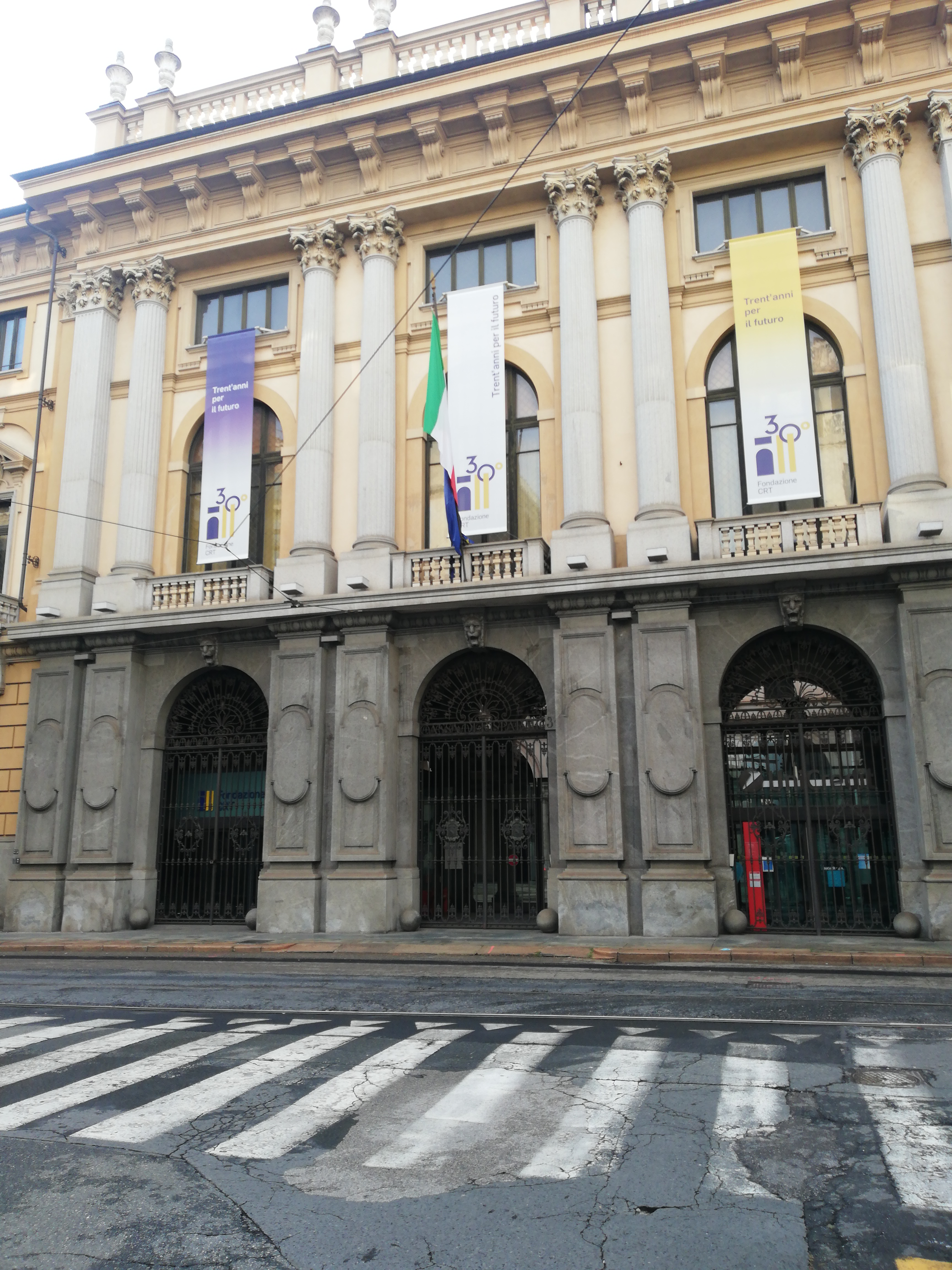
- Building on Via XX Settembre 29-31 in Turin, CRT head office from 1883 to 1997
- Native name: Banca Cassa di Risparmio di Torino S.p.A.
- Formerly: Cassa di Risparmio di Torino
- Type: subsidiary
- Industry: Financial services
- Founded: 1827; 1991 (S.p.A.)
- Defunct: 2002
- Fate: Absorbed by UniCredit
- Successor: Retail branches of UniCredit Banca; Other divisions of UniCredit; Fondazione CRT (charity only)
- Headquarters: Turin, Italy
- Products: Retail and Investment banking
- Owner: Fondazione CRT (1991–97); Unicredito (1997–98); UniCredit (1998–2002)
- Parent: Fondazione CRT (1991–97); Unicredito (1997–98); UniCredit (1998–2002)
- Website: www.bancacrt.it

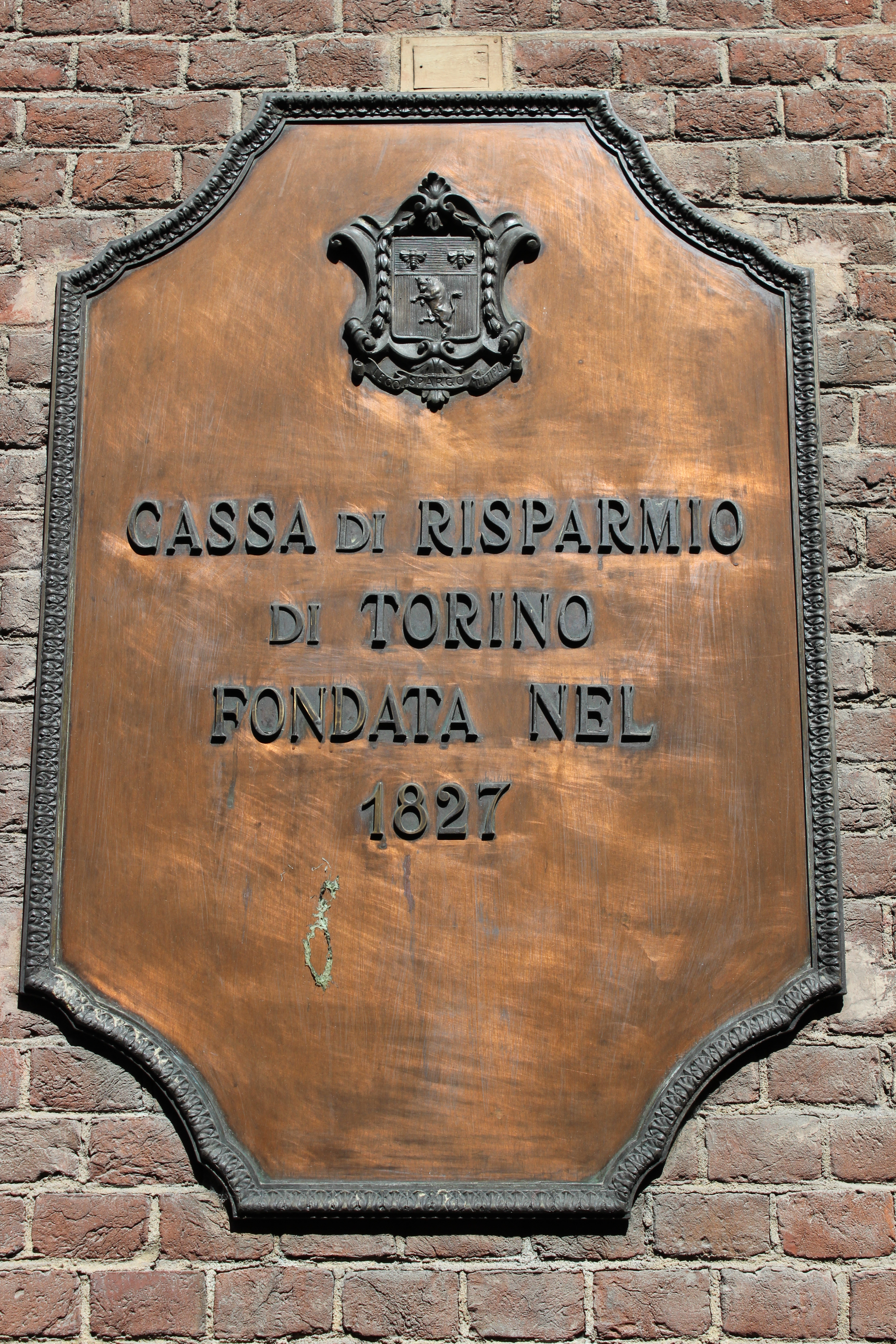
A crest on the wall of a branch in Chieri, in the Province of Turin

Banca Cassa di Risparmio di Torino S.p.A., also known as Banca CRT or Caritorino, was an Italian savings bank based in Turin, founded in 1827 and merged into Unicredito in 1997. In 1998, Unicredito merged with Credito Italiano to form UniCredito Italiano, later known as UniCredit. In 2002, Banca CRT was absorbed into the parent company.

The former owner of Banca CRT, Fondazione Cassa di Risparmio di Torino (Fondazione CRT), as of 31 December 2013, still owned 2.506% voting rights of UniCredit, as 7th largest shareholder. On 31 December 1999, Fondazione CRT was the second largest shareholder of UniCredit with 14.228% of the total ordinary shares (704,943,077 of 4,954,465,306).

== History ==
Cassa di Risparmio di Torino was founded in 1827 (199 years ago) with a philanthropic ideals, at that time still in the Kingdom of Sardinia. Before 1950s, the bank already acquired the local banks in Casale Monferrato, Pinerolo and Ivrea. In 1991, due to Legge Amato, the daily banking operation, charity and ownership were split into a società per azioni (Banca CRT S.p.A.), and a banking foundation (Fondazione Cassa di Risparmio di Torino; Fondazione CRT).

In the 1990s, Banca CRT absorbed Banca Subalpina and Banco di Bergamo as well as had a minority shares holding in other saving banks (Italian: Cassa di Risparmio) of Bra, Fossano, Saluzzo, Savigliano and Tortona in southern Piedmont, as well as Banca della Valle d'Aosta. Banca CRT also sold the minority interests in Cassa di Risparmio di Calabria e Lucania (Carical) to a consortium of Cassa di Risparmio delle Provincie Lombarde and Fondazione Carical in 1994. The minority interests in Cassa di Risparmio di Città di Castello (40%) was also sold in 1993.

On 30 September 1997, Banca CRT joined Unicredito, which already had Cariverona Banca and Cassamarca as members. On 15 October 1998 UniCredito merged with Credito Italiano, to form UniCredito Italiano, which was the parent company of Banca CRT with 100% ownership until 2002. The former subsidiaries of Banca CRT were Banca Mediocredito di Torino (63.26% of the total shares in 2000) and Casse e Assicurazioni Vita (40% of the total shares in 2000). On 31 December 2001, Banca CRT had a shareholders' equity of €1.591 billion. On 1 July 2002, Banca CRT was absorbed into Credito Italiano along with Cariverona, Cassamarca, Caritro, C.R. Trieste and Rolo Banca. At the same time Credito Italiano was renamed into UniCredit Banca.

== See also ==
- List of banks in Italy
