= La Cassa di Ravenna =

- Trade name: La Cassa
- Type: Unlisted public S.p.A.
- ISIN: IT0001005229
- Industry: Financial services
- Founded: 1840
- Headquarters: Ravenna, Italy
- Net income: ▼ (€23 million) (2016)
- Total assets: ▼€6.891 billion (2016)
- Total equity: ▼€479 million (2016)
Owner
CR Ravenna Foundation	(49.40%)
other shareholders
- Subsidiaries: Banca di Imola; Banco di Lucca e del Tirreno; Consultinvest Asset Management
- Capital ratio: ▲11.43% (Group CET1, Dec.2016)
- Website: www.lacassa.com

La Cassa di Ravenna S.p.A., formerly Cassa di Risparmio di Ravenna S.p.A. and Cassa di Risparmio di Ravenna, is an Italian private and independent savings bank based in Ravenna, Emilia-Romagna, founded in 1840. The bank also has branches in Bologna, Milano and Rome.

== History ==
Since the bank reform due to Legge Amato in 1991, the bank was split into a società per azioni and a non-profit banking foundation "Fondazione Cassa di Risparmio di Ravenna".

In 2016, the minority shareholders of subsidiary Argentario, including Assicurazioni Generali (for 13.50%), accepted the plan to sell their shares of Argentario to the bank, for 16.191 shares of Argentario to 1 share of the bank. The bank paid the minority shareholders by treasury shares. The bank owned 98.24% shares of the intermediate holding company, increasing from 82.30%.

== Subsidiaries ==
As of 31 December 2016

- Banco di Lucca e del Tirreno
- Italcredi (70.00%)
- Sorit (76.05%)
- Banca di Imola
- Sifin
- Consultinvest Asset Management SGR (joint venture, 50.00%)

Former

- Argentario (ex-Società Finanziaria di Banche Romagnole)

== Former equity interests ==
- Cassa di Risparmio di Saluzzo (2%)

== See also ==
- Cassa di Risparmio di Cesena - another bank from Romagna region
  - Banca di Romagna
- Cassa dei Risparmi di Forlì e della Romagna - another bank from Romagna region
- Banca Carim - another bank from Romagna region
