= Cassa di Risparmio di Pisa =

Italian savings bank and charity organization

- Native name: Cassa di Risparmio di Pisa S.p.A.
- Type: Società per Azioni
- Industry: Financial services
- Founded: 15 June 1834; 7 April 1992 (S.p.A.)
- Defunct: 30 June 2006 (S.p.A.)
- Fate: merged into CR Lucca Pisa Livorno
- Successor: Cassa di Risparmio di Lucca Pisa Livorno; Fondazione Pisa
- Headquarters: Pisa, Italy
- Services: Retail banking
- Owner: Banca Popolare di Lodi (indirect)
- Parent: Cassa di Risparmio di Lucca (100%)

Cassa di Risparmio di Pisa is a former Italian savings bank and charity organization, based in Pisa, Tuscany. The bank was spin off into a banking foundation and a Società per Azioni in 1992.

The S.p.A. was acquired by Banca Popolare di Lodi, which was completely absorbed into its subsidiary the saving bank of Lucca in 2006. While the banking foundation, Ente Cassa di Risparmio di Pisa and then Fondazione Cassa di Risparmio di Pisa (currently Fondazione Pisa), still operates as a non-profit organization. The foundation also inherited the arts collection of the former bank.

== History ==
Cassa di Risparmio di Pisa was formed on 15 June 1834.

=== Casse Toscane ===
Due to Legge Amato, the bank was split into an ente and a società per azioni on 7 April 1992 (gazetted on 6 May). About 13.05% shares of the new company were non-voting saving shares (Italian: Azione di risparmio). The ente immediately sold about 70% shares to Casse Toscane (and received 11.5% shares of Casse Toscane), a new intermediate holding company for the saving bank (Italian: Cassa di Risparmio) of Pisa, Florence, Livorno, Lucca, Pistoia–Pescia, San Miniato and Banca del Monte di Lucca. The ente only hold about 16.95% voting rights of the bank directly or about 25% combined (excluding the saving shares).

=== Casse del Tirreno ===
In 1995, CR Pisa, Livorno, Lucca and Banca Monte Lucca quit the union and formed Holding Casse del Tirreno (literally Tyrrhenian saving banks).

=== Banca Popolare di Lodi ===
In 1999, C.R. Pisa, Livorno and Lucca were acquired by Banca Popolare di Lodi (BPL) through sub-holding companies.

In 2000 C.R. Pisa had 59 branches. At that time Casse del Tirreno owned 61.69% shares of C.R. Pisa S.p.A.. Istituto di Credito delle Casse di Risparmio Italiane acted as an intermediate holding company (ICCRI, a subsidiary of Bipielle Partecipazioni, another intermediate holding company) that owned 50.01% Casse del Tirreno. However, CR Pisa SpA also owned 1.35% of Casse del Tirreno.

In 2001 Casse del Tirreno was absorbed into ICCRI – Banca Federale Europea (ex-ICCRI), which hold 61.31% shares of CR Pisa; Bipielle Partecipazioni owned an additional 12.97% shares of CR Pisa S.p.A. Pisa Foundation also became a minority shareholders of ICCRI for 7.32%, due to the transactions.

In 2002 Bipielle Retail became the new intermediate holding company for the 74.28% shares, while Pisa Foundation owned 25.63% shares of CR Pisa S.p.A., as well as 3.91% of BPL's sub-holding Bipielle Investimenti.

In 2003, through CR Lucca S.p.A. (and another intermediate holding company Reti Bancarie), BPL completely privatized CR Pisa SpA. Pisa Foundation owned 7.48% shares of CR Lucca S.p.A. instead. However, BPL and Pisa Foundation also signed an agreement on 12 December 2003 that BPL would buy the shares from the foundation before 15 January 2008. BPL also bought the shares of Bipielle Investimenti from the foundation.

=== Absorbed to CR Lucca Pisa Livorno ===
In 2006 CR Pisa SpA was completely absorbed into CR Lucca SpA, which the latter was renamed into CR Lucca, Pisa & Livorno SpA. Immediately after the merger, on 1 July 2006 Pisa Foundation owned 6.66% shares of the new entity. The last annual report of CR Pisa SpA shown the bank had a shareholders equity of €504.789 million on 31 December 2005.

== See also ==
Other saving bank from the provincial capital of Tuscany

- Banca CR Firenze
- Cassa di Risparmio di Carrara
- Cassa di Risparmi di Livorno
- Cassa di Risparmio di Lucca
- Cassa di Risparmio di Prato
- Cassa di Risparmio di Pistoia e della Lucchesia

Other banks from the province of Pisa

- Cassa di Risparmio di San Miniato
- Cassa di Risparmio di Volterra
- Banca di Pisa e Fornacette Credito Cooperativo
- List of banks in Italy
