= Fondazione Pisa =

Italian banking foundation

- Formerly: Fondazione Cassa di Risparmio di Pisa
- Predecessor: Charity function of Cassa di Risparmio di Pisa
- Founded: 7 April 1992 (spin off)
- Headquarters: 29 via Pietro Toselli, Pisa, Italy
- Key people: Claudio Pugelli (Chairman)
- Total assets: €636.8 million (2015)
- Total equity: ▲€503.7 million (2015)
- Subsidiaries: Fondazione Palazzo Blu; Fondazione Dopo di Noi a Pisa; Fondazione Pisana per la Scienza
- Website: fondazionepisa.it

The Fondazione Pisa (formerly Fondazione Cassa di Risparmio di Pisa) is a charity organization that was spun off from Cassa di Risparmio di Pisa (the Saving Bank of Pisa) in 1992. From 1992 to 1999 the foundation was the major shareholder of the bank, but was gradually sold to Banca Popolare di Lodi (and its successor Banco Popolare).

== History ==
In 1992 Cassa di Risparmio di Pisa was transformed from a statutory corporation to a Società per Azioni (S.p.A.), which the original statuary corporation was renamed into Ente Cassa di Risparmio di Pisa (Fondazione Pisa, Pisa Foundation), which acted as the major shareholder of the S.p.A. for 86.95% shares at the date of incorporation. The foundation immediately formed a larger banking group with other saving banks: Casse Toscane, which the new holding company hold 70% shares of CR Pisa S.p.A., with Pisa Foundation only retained 16.68% shares of the bank directly. In 1996 the banking foundation of Cassa di Risparmio di Lucca, Pisa and Livorno quit Casse Toscane and formed another banking group Casse del Tirreno, which was acquired by Banca Popolare di Lodi in 1999, through sub-holding companies. The foundations of Pisa, Lucca and Livorno retained minority interests in Casse del Tirreno.

Through several transactions by cash and shares swap, the foundation completely disposal its former bank in 2008. Pisa Foundation received the shares of ICCRI – Banca Federale Europea when Casse del Tirreno was absorbed into ICCRI in 2001, which was then converted to the shares of Bipielle Investimenti in 2002, which was finally disposed for cash of €156,730,172 in 2003 (based on €147,239,710 agreed on 4 December 1999, plus interests since 16 June 2000 in a rate of 6 months Euribor + 0.25%).

Pisa Foundation also received 7.48% shares of CR Lucca S.p.A. in 2003 by selling 25.63% shares of CR Pisa; CR Lucca was renamed to CR Lucca, Pisa e Livorno in 2006. The foundation did not participate in the capital increase, which made their ratio of ownership was dropped from 7.48% to 6.66%. On 15 January 2008 Pisa Foundation sold 6.66% shares of Cassa di Risparmio di Lucca Pisa Livorno to Banco Popolare for about €116 million (about €2.47 per shares). However the sales was in fact agreed in 2003, which would excise on or before 15 January 2008.

The foundation became a minority shareholder of Società Aeroporto Toscano (the operator of Pisa International Airport) in 2007; in 2009 the foundation owned 4.938% of the shares; in 2010 the ownership ratio increased to 5.208%; it reached 8.213% in 2011 and 8.623% in 2012.

As at 31 December 2015, the foundation was the minority shareholder of the following listed companies: Intesa Sanpaolo (0.066%), UniCredit (0.015%), Eni (0.033%), Enel (0.026%), Toscana Aeroporti (the successor of Società Aeroporto Toscano) (4.568%) and Banca Sistema (7.399%). Pisa Foundation had an equity of €503.7 million at 31 December 2015, which 20% revenue, net of administrative expense were required to be retained profit, with the rest for the charity expense.

On 30 December 2015 Pisa Foundation funded €500,000 for the restoration of San Paolo a Ripa d'Arno.

== Fondazione Palazzo Blu ==
Palazzo Blu is a building located in 9 Lungarno Gambacorti, Pisa. Pisa Foundation bought the building and founded the Fondazione Palazzo Blu to manage a museum. Despite a different address, 29 via Pietro Toselli, for the headquarters of the Palazzo Blu Foundation and the Pisa Foundation, it refers to the same building.

The museum housed several arts collections, including Bandinella della confraternita di Santa Lucia dei Ricucchi of Francesco da Volterra, Madonna con Bambino e santi of Taddeo di Bartolo.
