= Cassa di Risparmio di Pistoia e della Lucchesia =

Italian regional bank in Tuscany

- Trade name: Caript
- Formerly: Cassa di Risparmio di Pistoia e Pescia S.p.A.
- Type: subsidiary of a listed company
- Industry: Financial services
- Predecessor: Cassa di Risparmio di Pistoia; Cassa di Risparmio di Pescia
- Founded: 1831 (Pistoia); 1936 (Pistoia e Pescia); 1992 (S.p.A. and Fondazione)
- Headquarters: 3 via Roma, Pistoia, Italy
- Area served: Provinces of Pistoia, Tuscany; Provinces of Massa–Carrara, Tuscany; Provinces of Lucca, Tuscany
- Net income: ▲ (€1,605,726) (2014)
- Total assets: ▼€2,795,007,930 (2014)
- Total equity: ▼€291,419,997 (2014)
- Owners: Intesa Sanpaolo (8.105%); Banca CR Firenze (74.883%); C.R. Pistoia–Pescia Foundation (16.525%) others (0.487%)
- Parent: Intesa Sanpaolo (through Banca CR Firenze)
- Capital ratio: 18.67% (CET1)
- Website: www.caript.it

Cassa di Risparmio di Pistoia e della Lucchesia (literally The Savings bank of Pistoia and Lucchesia; known as Caripistoia, Caript or just CRPT in short) is an Italian regional bank based in Pistoia, Tuscany. The bank was a subsidiary of Banca CR Firenze, with Intesa Sanpaolo as the ultimate holding company.

== History ==
Cassa di Risparmio di Pistoia e Pescia was found in 1936 by the merger of Cassa di Risparmio di Pistoia (found 1831) and Pescia (1840). The bank also absorbed Banca di Pistoia in 1932, and Pistoia Mount of Piety in 1937.

=== Casse Toscane ===
Due to Legge Amato, the bank was split into a società per azioni (limited company), and a non-profit organization (Ente Cassa di Risparmio di Pistoia e Pescia, which was renamed to Fondazione Cassa di Risparmio di Pistoia e Pescia in late 1990s) on 13 April 1992 (gazetted on 14 May). At that time around 17.748% of the shares were "saving shares" (4,000,000, Italian: azioni di risparmio). The ente also immediately sold around 51% shares to an intermediate holding company Holding Casse Toscane (literally Tuscan saving banks), which consists of the saving bank (Italian: Cassa di Risparmio) of Florence (Banca CR Firenze), Livorno, Lucca, Pisa, San Miniato as well as Banca del Monte di Lucca. In return the ente received around 10% shares of the holding, making the ente hold about 31.525% of the shares of the bank directly or about 36.4% combined (saving shares excluded), as well as minority interests in other banks. In 1995 CR Lucca, Livorno and Pisa, as well as Banca del Monte di Lucca, formed their own banking group (Casse del Tirreno), leaving Florence, Pistoia–Pescia and San Miniato in Casse Toscane.

=== Banca CR Firenze ===
In March 1998 Pistoia–Pescia and San Miniato were demerged from Casse Toscane as Finanziaria CRPT and Finanziaria CRSM respectively. In November Finanziaria CRPT, which hold 11,357,012 ordinary shares (about 50.39% share capitals or 61.26% ordinary shares; 10,000 lire each) of the bank, was merged back to CR Pistoia–Pescia. In December 1999 Florence Saving Bank purchased 51% of the ordinary shares, with the foundation retained a minority interests only (9,083,498 of 10,000 lire par value; 49% of the ordinary shares equivalent to 40.3% share capitals as at 31 December 2001. plus preferred shares). The foundation also owned 3.95% shares of Banca CR Firenze (as of 31 December 2000), due to the acquisition.

In 2005 Banca CR Firenze purchased an additional 9% ordinary shares from the foundation for €32,533,751.25. The foundation retained 74,151,005 ordinary shares (40% of all ordinary shares) and 15,200,000 preferred shares (38% of all preferred shares) as at 31 December 2006 for €0.63 par value (increased from €0.52 in 2005), which equivalent to 39.65% total share capitals.

=== Intesa Sanpaolo ===
The Saving bank of Pistoia and Pescia followed Banca CR Firenze merged into banking group Intesa Sanpaolo on 29 January 2008. The foundation sold 44,275,505 ordinary and saving shares (19.65% total share capitals) for about €84 million in January 2012.

In 2012, the bank was renamed into Cassa di Risparmio di Pistoia e della Lucchesia, as the branches of the bank was extended from the Province of Pistoia to the Province of Lucca (from 10 branches to 31 branches in 2012) and the Province of Massa–Carrara (7 new branches), by selling 3 branches in the Province of Pistoia and all branches in the Provinces of Florence (4), Prato (4) and Bologna (11) to sister companies. After the deals the number of shares was increased from 225,377,500 to 272,771,873, which Banca CR Firenze hold 74.883%, Intesa Sanpaolo hold 8.105% and the foundation hold 16.525% (but all were golden shares); preferred shares were converted to ordinary shares.

As at 31 December 2014, the foundation also owned 0.01413% shares of Intesa Sanpaolo.

== Sponsorship ==
The bank was a sponsor of Pistoia Basket 2000

== See also ==
- Banca CR Firenze
- Cassa di Risparmio di Carrara
- Cassa di Risparmio di Lucca Pisa Livorno
  - Cassa di Risparmi di Livorno
  - Cassa di Risparmio di Pisa
- Cassa di Risparmio di Prato
- List of banks in Italy
