= Cassa di Risparmio di Lucca Pisa Livorno =

Italian savings bank

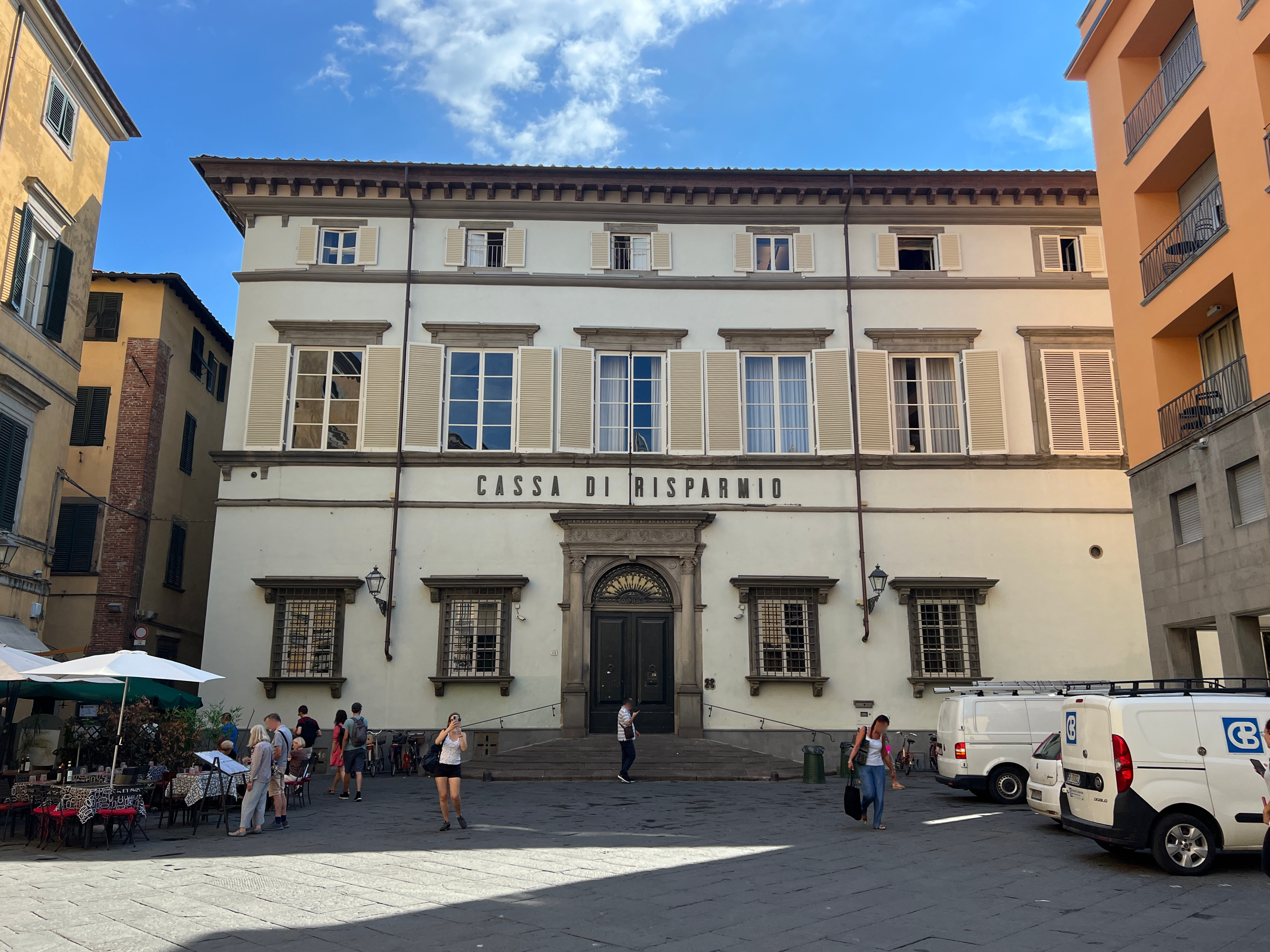
- Head office in Lucca
- Company type: Division (former subsidiary)
- Predecessor: Cassa di Risparmio di Lucca; Cassa di Risparmio di Pisa; Cassa di Risparmi di Livorno
- Founded: 1835 in Lucca; 1992 (as S.p.A.); 2006 (as CR Lucca Pisa Livorno); 2011 (as a division)
- Headquarters: Lucca, Italy
- Owner: Banco BPM
- Parent: Banco BPM
- Website: Official website

Cassa di Risparmio di Lucca Pisa e Livorno S.p.A. was an Italian saving bank based in Lucca. It was a subsidiary of Banco Popolare and currently a sub-division (under BPL) and brand of the group Banco BPM.

== History ==
=== Cassa di Risparmio di Lucca ===
Cassa di Risparmio di Lucca was founded in the Duchy of Lucca on 9 July 1835. Due to Legge Amato, a Società per azioni that runs bank activity, and a banking foundation that runs charity activities, were formed on 7 April 1992 (gazetted on 29 April). The foundation immediately sold about 51% shares to an intermediate holding company "Holding Casse Toscane" (literally Tuscan saving banks holding), which also consist of the saving banks (Italian: Cassa di Risparmio) of Florence, Livorno, Pisa, Pistoia, San Miniato as well as Banca del Monte di Lucca. CR Lucca received about 18% shares of the holding, making the foundation hold about 49% shares of their own bank directly, or about 58.18% directly and indirectly combined.

In 1995, CR Pisa, Livorno, Lucca and Banca Monte Lucca quit the union and formed "Holding Casse del Tirreno" (literally Tyrrhenian saving banks holding).

=== Banco Popolare era ===
In 1999 the three saving banks became part of Banca Popolare di Lodi, with the foundation of CR Lucca retained 49.66% shares on its own bank. In 2000s, Banca Popolare di Lodi started the internal reorganization of ownership structure (In 2000 Casse del Tirreno was a subsidiary of Istituto di Credito delle Casse di Risparmio Italiane (ICCRI), which in turn a subsidiary of Bipielle Partecipazioni, a subsidiary of Banca Popolare di Lodi; in 2001 Casse del Tirreno was absorbed into ICCRI; in 2002 Bipielle Retail became the new intermediate holding company; in 2003 Pisa and Livorno started to become a subsidiary of Lucca, while Lucca was a subsidiary of Reti Bancarie) In 2005 Pisa and Livorno were whole owned subsidiaries of Lucca, while Lucca was a subsidiary of Banca Popolare di Lodi through direct (20.93%) and indirect ownership (BPL owned 73.52% shares of Reti Bancarie; Reti Bancarie owned 46.28% shares of Lucca).

=== Merger of CR Lucca, Pisa and Livorno ===
In 2006 Pisa and Livorno were absorbed into the Saving Bank of Lucca, as well as renamed into Cassa di Risparmio di Lucca Pisa Livorno. In 2007 it became a member of Banco Popolare. Banco Popolare acquired the minority interest of CR Lucca Pisa Livorno SpA from the banking foundation of Pisa in 2008 (foundation excised a put option), and from Livorno in 2011. The bank group also swapped the shares of Credito Bergamasco with the banking foundation of CR Lucca in 2010, as well as paid €156,363,203 in cash, by the foundation excising the put option. After the transactions, Banco Popolare became 100% owner of the shares, which turned the company into a division of the bank group. The last annual report of the bank shown the company had a shareholders' equity of €1.197 billion on 31 December 2010.

== Sponsorship ==
The banking division was a sponsor of A.S. Lucchese Libertas 1905.

== Banking foundations ==
Fondazione Cassa di Risparmio di Lucca was the second largest shareholder of Banco Popolare (2.891%), behind BlackRock which actually a proxy for clients (as of 31 December 2015). The foundation also owned 20% of Banca del Monte di Lucca, as well as a minority ownership in Cassa Depositi e Prestiti (0.984%), CDP Reti (0.094%), F2i SGR (2.241%), as well as several blue chip and/or listed companies: Intesa Sanpaolo (0.020%), Banca Monte dei Paschi di Siena (0.184%), Banca Carige (1.109%), Banca Mediolanum (0.041%), Cattolica Assicurazioni (0.324%), UnipolSai (0.148%), Assicurazioni Generali (0.052%), Enel (0.037%), Eni (0.027%), Atlantia (0.064%), Telecom Italia (0.07%), Snam (0.0899%), Terna (0.144%), STMicroelectronics (0.132%), Engie (0.004%), Total (0.002%), Exor (0.032%), Fiat Chrysler Automobiles (0.012%), as at 31 December 2015. It had an equity of €1.2 billion.

After the merger of Banco Popolare with Banca Popolare di Milano (and the recapitalization of Banco Popolare in 2016), it saw the status as one of the large shareholder of the new bank Banco BPM, was diluted. It had an art collection.

Fondazione Pisa and Fondazione Livorno did not kept Banco Popolare as their investments.

== See also ==
- Banca CR Firenze
- Cassa di Risparmio di Carrara
- Cassa di Risparmio di Prato
- Cassa di Risparmio di Pistoia e della Lucchesia
- List of banks in Italy
