= Carispezia =

Italian savings bank

Crédit Agricole Carispezia
- Formerly: Cassa di Risparmio della Spezia
- Type: Statutory corporation (until 1992); Subsidiary (since 1992); Società per azioni (since 1992)
- Industry: Financial services
- Founded: 1842
- Headquarters: La Spezia, Liguria
- Key people: Andrea Corradino (President)
- Products: Retail banking
- Revenue: ▲€110 million (2013)
- Operating income: ▲€40.4 million (2013)
- Net income: ▲€14.4 million (2013)
- Total assets: ▲€2.68 billion (2013)
- Total equity: ▲€185 million (2013)
- Owner: Crédit Agricole Italia (80%); Fondazione Carispezia (20%)
- Number of employees: ▲561 (2013)
- Parent: Crédit Agricole S.A. (via Crédit Agricole Italia)
- Website: http://www.credit-agricole.it/

Crédit Agricole Carispezia S.p.A. formerly known as Cassa di Risparmio della Spezia S.p.A., or Carispezia in short, is an Italian savings bank, which is part of Crédit Agricole Italia, the Italian arm of French banking group Crédit Agricole.

Since 2016, the brand Crédit Agricole Italia was used for the whole banking group.

== History ==
Found in 1842, Carispezia became a società per azioni in 1992, which a new legislation split the bank non-profit making ownership (a banking foundation) and banking operation (a s.p.a.). Cassa di Risparmio delle Provincie Lombarde (Cariplo) also became a minority shareholder of the bank for 25 billion lire nominal value of share capital.

=== Cariplo & Banca Intesa era ===
In 1995, Carispezia was merged with the saving bank of Alessandria and Carrara, with Cariplo and the foundations of the banks became the new shareholder of a new holding company Carinord Holding SpA (acronym of Cassa di Risparmio Nord), which held 68.09% of Carispezia shares, and 31.91% shares remain held by Fondazione Carispezia. In 1998, Cariplo held 30.94% shares of Carinord Holding.

In 1998, Cariplo merged with Banco Ambrosiano Veneto to form Banca Intesa, which the shares of Carinord Holding held by Cariplo was transferred to Banca Intesa.

In 2002, the saving bank of Alessandria was split from the union. Carinord 2 SpA was formed, with Banca Intesa held 41.14%, Fondazione Carispezia held 31.83%, Fondazione CR Carrara held 27.03%. Fondazione Carispezia was the de facto major shareholder through direct and indirect holding of Carispezia's shares.

As part of Banca Intesa ended in 2003, which Carinord 2 was acquired by Banca CR Firenze (for Spezia only) and Banca Carige (for Carrara only). Banca Intesa would receive €115 million for its 41.14% shares on Carinord 2.

=== Banca CR Firenze era ===
In 2004, Banca CR Firenze completed the takeover of Carispezia, which the bank acquired the shares of Carinord 2 from the foundation. In 2006, the foundation further decreased its direct ownership on Carispezia to 20%.

=== Return to Intesa ===
In 2007, Intesa Sanpaolo, the successor of Banca Intesa, merged with Banca CR Firenze by shares exchange. In 2008, the privatization was completed, thus Carispezia finally acted as a subsidiary of Intesa instead of a loose shareholding union.

=== Crédit Agricole era ===
Carispezia old logo

In 2010, Crédit Agricole acquired Intesa Sanpaolo's investment in Cassa di Risparmio della Spezia (equal to 80% of the capital) for 740 million euros, as well as 96 Group branches.

However, in 2011, as part of Crédit Agricole further direct investment into Italy as well as disinvestment in Intesa Sanpaolo, Carispezia was acquired by the French banking group, and place under the ownership of its Italian subsidiary, Cariparma.

The brand Carispezia survived the takeover, despite under the name "Carispezia-Crédit Agricole" in the logo. Nevertheless, in 2016 the banking group started to use Crédit Agricole Italia as their brand, with a new logo for their subsidiary and a common website.

Since 2018, the general manager is Gianluca Borrelli, who has taken over from Carlo Piana who has moved to Crédit Agricole FriulAdria.

From 21 July 2019, it was merged by incorporation into the Italian parent company Crédit Agricole Italia.

== Sponsorship ==
Carispezia was the sponsor of Serie B club Spezia Calcio (as of 2017–18 season).

== See also ==
- Banca Carige, another Liguria based bank
