= Cassa di Risparmi di Livorno =

Italian regional bank and charity organization

- Type: Subsidiary of a listed company
- Industry: Financial services
- Founded: 4 April 1836; 7 April 1992 (spin off)
- Defunct: 30 June 2006
- Fate: merged into C.R. Lucca Pisa Livorno
- Successor: Cassa di Risparmio di Lucca Pisa Livorno; Fondazione Livorno
- Headquarters: 21 Piazza Grande, Livorno, Italy
- Services: Retail banking
- Owner: Banca Popolare di Lodi (indirect)
- Parent: Cassa di Risparmio di Lucca (100%)

Cassa di Risparmi di Livorno is a former Italian regional bank and charity organization, based in Livorno, Tuscany. In 1992 the organization was split into a limited company (società per azioni) and a banking foundation Fondazione Cassa di Risparmi di Livorno (currently Fondazione Livorno).

The S.p.A. was sold to Banca Popolare di Lodi, which was completed absorbed into the saving bank of Lucca, Pisa & Livorno in 2006 (along with fellow saving bank in Pisa). Livorno Foundation, found 1992, still operates as a non-profit organization.

== History ==
Cassa di Risparmi di Livorno was found on 4 April 1836. Due to Legge Amato, on 7 April 1992, the bank was split into Cassa di Risparmi di Livorno S.p.A. and Fondazione Cassa di Risparmi di Livorno (gazetted on 29 April). The foundation immediately sold about 52.25% shares of the company to an intermediate holding company Holding Casse Toscane (literally Tuscan saving banks), which was formed by the saving bank (Italian: Cassa di Risparmio) of Livorno, Florence, Lucca, Pisa, Pistoia & Pescia, San Miniato as well as Banca del Monte di Lucca. Livorno Foundation received about 3.46% shares of the holding, making the foundation indirectly have a minority interests in other banks, as well as just about 47.75% controls on its own bank directly, and about 49.6% combined.

=== Casse del Tirreno era ===
In 1995, CR Livorno, Pisa, Lucca and Banca Monte Lucca quit the union and formed Holding Casse del Tirreno (literally Tyrrhenian saving banks). In 1999, CR Pisa, Livorno and Lucca were acquired by Banca Popolare di Lodi.

=== Banca Popolare di Lodi era ===
In 2000 CR Livorno had 47 branches. At that time Casse del Tirreno owned 57.64% shares of CR Livorno SpA (the rest held by the foundation). Istituto di Credito delle Casse di Risparmio Italiane acted as an intermediate holding company (ICCRI, a subsidiary of Bipielle Partecipazioni, another intermediate holding company) that owned 50.01% Casse del Tirreno. However, CR Livorno SpA also owned 0.19% of Casse del Tirreno. In 2001 Casse del Tirreno was absorbed into ICCRI – Banca Federale Europea (ex-ICCRI), which still hold 57.64%% shares; Bipielle Partecipazioni remained as an intermediate holding company of ICCRI. In 2002 Bipielle Retail became the new intermediate holding company. In 2003, through CR Lucca SpA, Banca Popolare di Lodi privatized CR Livorno SpA. The Foundation of CR Livorno owned 5.73% shares of CR Lucca SpA instead (based on 2005 share capitals). In 2006 CR Livorno SpA was completely absorbed into CR Lucca SpA, which the latter was renamed into CR Lucca, Pisa & Livorno SpA. At the same time the foundation sold most of the shares of CR Lucca SpA (5.047%) to Banca Popolare di Lodi, for €65,826,356.44 (retained 0.68% only). The last annual report of CR Livorno SpA shown the bank had a shareholders equity of €293.480 million on 31 December 2005.

== Bank Foundation ==
Livorno Foundation, as of 31 December 2014, is the minority shareholders of Cassa Depositi e Prestiti (0.10%), CDP Reti (0.03%), Banco di Lucca e del Tirreno (10%), Enel, Intesa Sanpaolo, UniCredit, Terna Group, Hera Group, Snam, Électricité de France, Engie, Enagás and Atlantia. The foundation had a shareholders equity of €213,224,012 on 31 December 2014.

On 16 December 2011 the foundation sold the remain 0.68% shares of CR Lucca, Pisa e Livorno S.p.A. to Banco Popolare for about €7.8 million (about €1.63 per shares).

== See also ==
- Banca CR Firenze
- Cassa di Risparmio di Carrara
- Cassa di Risparmio di Lucca
- Cassa di Risparmio di Pisa
- Cassa di Risparmio di Pistoia e della Lucchesia
- Cassa di Risparmio di Prato
- List of banks in Italy
