= Fondazione Carige =

Italian banking foundation and charity organization

Fondazione Cassa di Risparmio di Genova e Imperia is a charity organization based in Genoa, Liguria region. The foundation was the largest shareholders of Banca Carige.

== History ==
Due to Legge Amato, the bank activities of Cassa di Risparmio di Genova e Imperia was spin off to become Banca Carige Società per Azioni (a kind of limited company), while the original entity became Fondazione Cassa di Risparmio di Genova e Imperia, a banking foundation with a status of private legal person, but without shareholder.

The bank failed the comprehensive assessment in the run-up to the entry into force of European Banking Supervision in 2014. During the year the number of ordinary shares was increased from 2,174,664,623 to 10,167,553,157. The new shares made the bank recapitalized €779,288,853.4. The foundation only partly subscribed the capital increases that were allowed to them, with the rest was excised by borrowing money from Mediobanca (additional 7.037%). After the deal the foundation owned 12.142% ordinary shares of the bank (1,234,561,214), comparing to 46.52% in 2013 (1,011,689,946).

At the start of year the foundation reacquired some shares, which was increased to 1,270,944,145 number of shares (the total ordinary shares of the bank also increased to 10,393,917,760 number of shares, due to all share deal to privatize CR Carrara and Savona). On 8 May 2015 the foundation sold a further 10.271% ordinary shares (1,067,593,081 number of shares) of the bank to Malacalza Investimenti (a company chaired by Vittorio Malacalza). After the deal the foundation only kept 203,351,064 ordinary shares, or 1.956% of the total number of ordinary shares.

As at 31 December 2015 the foundation had a net assets of €69,960,698.

== Controversies ==
In 2014, La Repubblica Genoa edition reported that, the foundation had purchased a helicopter which was rarely used. Before the helicopter was donated to the Liguria Region, it was rarely used by the firemen of Genoa, which the foundation lent it to them.
