= Fondazione Cariparma =

Italian banking foundation and former bank

- Company type: private foundation
- Industry: charity organization
- Predecessor: Cassa di Risparmio di Parma e Monte di Credito su Pegno di Busseto
- Founded: 1859 (as bank); 1991 (as foundation)
- Headquarters: Italy
- Total assets: ▲€1.147 billion (2016)
- Total equity: ▲€1.000 billion (2016)
- Number of employees: 2 (2011)
- Website: http://www.fondazionecrp.it
- Footnotes / references data from 2016 bilancio

The Fondazione Cassa di Risparmio di Parma e Monte di Credito su Pegno di Busseto, known as Fondazione Cariparma, is an Italian banking foundation and former bank that spun off its banking activities in 1991. The foundation currently is a minority shareholder of Crédit Agricole Cariparma.

== History ==
Fondazione Cassa di Risparmio di Parma e Monte di Credito su Pegno di Busseto was formed in 1991 by the spin-off of the Cassa di Risparmio di Parma e Monte di Credito su Pegno di Busseto's banking activities as Cassa di Risparmio di Parma S.p.A. (Cariparma S.p.A.), in which the original legal person of the bank became the banking foundation instead. The bank, a società per azioni, merged with Cassa di Risparmio di Piacenza e Vigevano S.p.A. and then was acquired by Banca Intesa S.p.A.. The banking foundation also owned a small stake of Banca Intesa due to the acquisition. In 2007, the foundation parted away from Banca Intesa, after it was merged with Sanpaolo IMI on 1 January 2007 to become Intesa Sanpaolo. Intesa Sanpaolo also sold aforementioned Cariparma S.p.A. (as Cassa di Risparmio di Parma e Piacenza) to Intesa Sanpaolo's former shareholders Crédit Agricole and the banking foundation in the same year.

In 2015, Associazione di Fondazioni e di Casse di Risparmio S.p.A., a trade association of the former savings banks and now banking foundations, on behalf of its members, signed a memorandum of understanding (MoU) with Ministry of Economy and Finance for the new regulation on the assets of the foundations. According to the MoU, the foundations had to decentralize their investment from the banks they are originated from. The foundation also invested in F2i First Fund

In 2016 the foundation was invited to invest back to banking sector by joining the private equity fund Atlante that aiming to recapitalize the weak bank and purchase the securitizated non-performing loan. Atlante used most of the equity to bail out Banca Popolare di Vicenza as well as Veneto Banca, with the rest was invested in Atlante II fund, which was cooperated with the Italian government as part of the bail out of Banca Monte dei Paschi di Siena (BMPS). Atlante II purchased the securitizated non-performing loan from BMPS. However, Banca Popolare di Vicenza and Veneto Banca faced second bail-out by the Italian government, but in the process the shareholders were bailed-in, wiping the investment of Atlante and in turn Fondazione Cariparma.

In 2018, Fondazione Cariparma sold part of the shares of Crédit Agricole Cariparma (formerly known as Cassa di Risparmio di Parma e Piacenza) they owned, to another former owner of the bank, the Fondazione di Piacenza e Vigevano. The latter also owned the Cassa di Risparmio di Piacenza e Vigevano S.p.A. in the past.

=== Arts collection ===
Fondazione Cariparma had a museum in Palazzo Bossi Bocchi for its art collection.

In January 2017 marquess Maria Gabriella Pigoli Pallavicino, widow of marquess Pierluigi Pallavicino (a member of Pallavicini family) donated Palazzo Pallavicino to the foundation.
