= Toscana Aeroporti =

- Native name: Toscana Aeroporti S.p.A.
- Traded as: BIT: TYA
- Predecessor: Aeroporto di Firenze; Società Aeroporto Toscano
- Founded: 1 June 2015
- Headquarters: Florence, Italy
- Products: Airport operations
- Net income: 4,700,000 euro (2022)
- Website: www.toscana-aeroporti.com/en/

Toscana Aeroporti S.p.A. (Tuscan Airports) is an Italian company that manages Florence and Pisa International Airport. It is listed in Borsa Italiana.

The company was found on 1 June 2015 by the incorporation of Aeroporto di Firenze S.p.A. (AdF) into Società Aeroporto Toscano Galileo Galilei S.p.A. (SAT), as well as the latter renamed into Toscana Aeroporti S.p.A., relocated the headquarter from Pisa to Florence.

== Shareholders ==
As of 3 February 2016

Name	Percentage
Corporación América Italia S.r.l.	51.132%
Ente Cassa di Risparmio di Firenze	6.583%
So.G.IM S.p.A.	5.789%
Tuscany region	5.000%
Province of Pisa	
Fondazione Pisa	4.568%
