= Palazzo Blu =

Coordinates: 43.7155°N 10.3999°E

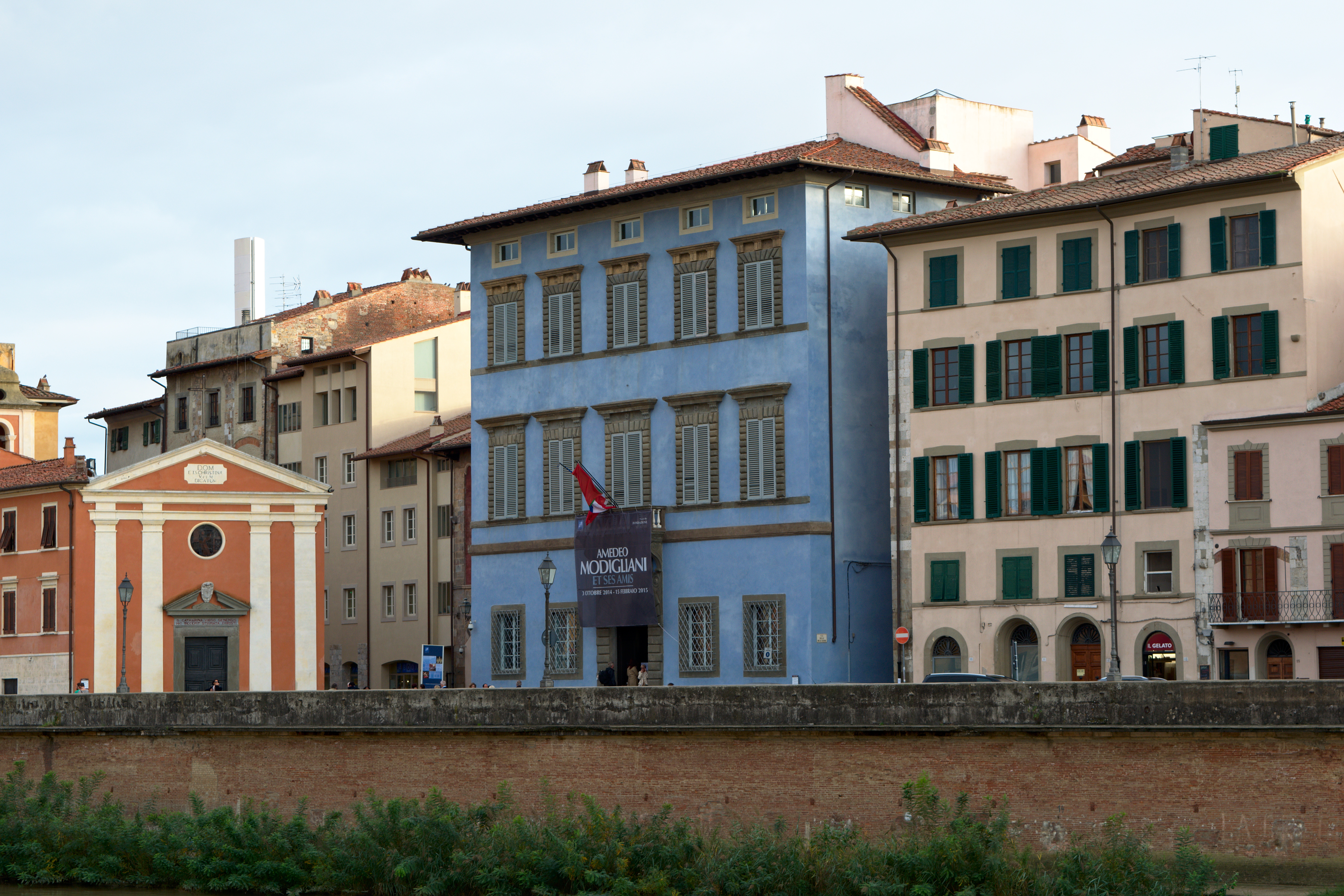
Palazzo Giuli Rosselmini Gualandi in Pisa, location of Palazzo Blu. The advertisement for the exhibit on Amedeo Modigliani is clearly visible, hanging from the balcony.

Palazzo Blu is a former aristocratic palace, now a center for temporary exhibitions and cultural activities located in 9 Lungarno Gambacorti, in the heart of the historic center of Pisa, region of Tuscany, Italy. This museum is managed by the Fondazione Palazzo Blu (a foundation funded by Fondazione Pisa), and is located in the Palazzo Giuli Rosselmini Gualandi (and Palazzo Casarosa), ancient palace restored by the Fondazione Pisa. Its name comes from the blue color uncovered during an architectural restoration, and attributable to the taste of Russian owners who acquired the Palazzo in the eighteenth century.

== Museum ==
The Palazzo Blu permanent exhibition is divided into three sections: the Fondazione Pisa collection, on the second floor, and the stately apartments and Simoneschi Collection (numismatics and antiquities) on the first floor. Some artists from the collections (from 300 and Renaissance to 1800 d.C.): Francesco da Volterra, Getto di Jacopo, Agnolo Gaddi, Cecco di Pietro, Taddeo di Bartolo, Benozzo Gozzoli, Vincenzo Foppa, Aurelio Lomi, il Cigoli, Orazio Gentileschi, Artemisia Gentileschi, Giovanni Battista Tempesti, Jean Baptiste Desmarais, Giuseppe Bezzuoli, Luigi Gioli. From the twentieth century collection: Umberto Vittorini, Mino Rosi, Ferruccio Pizzanelli and Fortunato Bellonzi.

== Auditorium ==
The Auditorium hosts conferences, workshops and events dedicated to the arts, to the culture and the territory.
