= Ente Cassa di Risparmio di Firenze =

Italian banking foundation

Ente Cassa di Risparmio di Firenze is a foundation originated from Cassa di Risparmio di Firenze. The foundation was the minority shareholders of Banca CR Firenze S.p.A. (until 2015) as well as the 5th largest shareholders of Intesa Sanpaolo, for 2.615% (414,655,221 as of 31 December 2015, a net increase from 410,855,221 at 31 December 2014). As of 31 December 2014 the ente also owned 14% of Aeroporto di Firenze, which became part of Toscana Aeroporti in 2015.

The ente was the major shareholders of the bank of the same name (Banca Cassa di Risparmio di Firenze), which was sold to Intesa Sanpaolo in 2008.

It had a shareholders' equity of €1,317,497,954 at 31 December 2014. Due to a reform in bank foundation, which requires foundations to invest at most 33% on a single company, the ente sold part of its stake in Intesa Sanpaolo in 2015.

On 22 May 2014 the ente made a put option with Intesa Sanpaolo to sell the remain 10.26% stake in Banca CR Firenze. The put option was excised on 29 April 2015 for €182.5 million.
