= Cassa di Risparmio di Volterra =

Italian bank

CR Volterra
- Native name: Cassa di Risparmio di Volterra S.p.A.
- Type: private società per Azioni
- Industry: Financial services
- Founded: 1494 (mount of piety); 1893 (CR Volterra); 1992 (S.p.A.)
- Headquarters: Volterra, Italy
- Key people: Giovanni Manghetti (chairman)
- Services: Retail banking
- Net income: ▼ (€11,272,074) (2015)
- Total assets: ▲€2,337,404,630 (2015)
- Total equity: ▼€169,080,013 (2015)
- Owner: Fondazione CR Volterra (75%); CR San Miniato S.p.A. (20%); Fondazione CR San Miniato (5%)
- Parent: Fondazione CR Volterra
- Capital ratio: 12.95% (CET1)
- Website: crvolterra.it

Cassa di Risparmio di Volterra S.p.A. is an Italian saving bank based in Volterra, in the Province of Pisa, Tuscany. The bank was owned by the banking foundation of the same name (Fondazione Cassa di Risparmio di Volterra) for 75% stake. Cassa di Risparmio di San Miniato owned 20% and Fondazione Cassa di Risparmio di San Miniato owned an additional 5% stake.

== History ==
Cassa di Risparmio di Volterra absorbed Monte di Credito su Pegno di Volterra in 1952, a bank with mount of piety origin. Due to Legge Amato, in 1992 the statutory corporation of Cassa di Risparmio di Volterra was split into a limited company (Italian: società per Azioni) and a banking foundation. In 2004, 25% stake of the bank was purchased by Cassa di Risparmio di San Miniato for €85 million.

== See also ==
- Cassa di Risparmio di Pisa
