= Crédit Agricole Italia =

Italian banking group

- Formerly: Cassa di Risparmio di Parma; Cassa di Risparmio di Parma S.p.A.; Cassa di Risparmio di Parma e Piacenza S.p.A.; Crédit Agricole Cariparma S.p.A.
- Company type: Subsidiary
- Industry: Financial services
- Founded: 1859 (as C.R. Parma); 1991 (as C.R. Parma S.p.A.); 1992 (as C.R. Parma e Piacenza S.p.A.); 2007 (acquired by Crédit Agricole)
- Headquarters: Parma, Italy
- Number of locations: ▼815 (2016)
Key people
Ariberto Fassati	(Executive Chairman)
Fabrizio Pezzani	(Executive Vice-Chairman)
Xavier Musca	(Vice-Chairman)
Giampiero Maioli	(CEO & Executive Director)
- Services: Retail and corporate banking
- Net income: ▼€208 million (2016)
- Total assets: ▲€55,0 billion (Q2 2025)
- Total equity: ▲€5,082 million (2016)
Owner
Crédit Agricole S.A.	(76.5%)
Fondazione Cariparma	(13.5%)
SACAM International	(10.0%)
- Number of employees: ▲8,268 (2016)
- Parent: Crédit Agricole S.A.
Subsidiaries
Carispezia	(80.00%)
FriulAdria	(80.17%)
Crédit Agricole Leasing Italia	(85.00%)
- Capital ratio: 11.4% (Group CET1, December 2016)
Rating
Moody's	(no rating/withdrew, July 2017)
- Website: www.credit-agricole.it
- Footnotes / references in consolidated financial statement

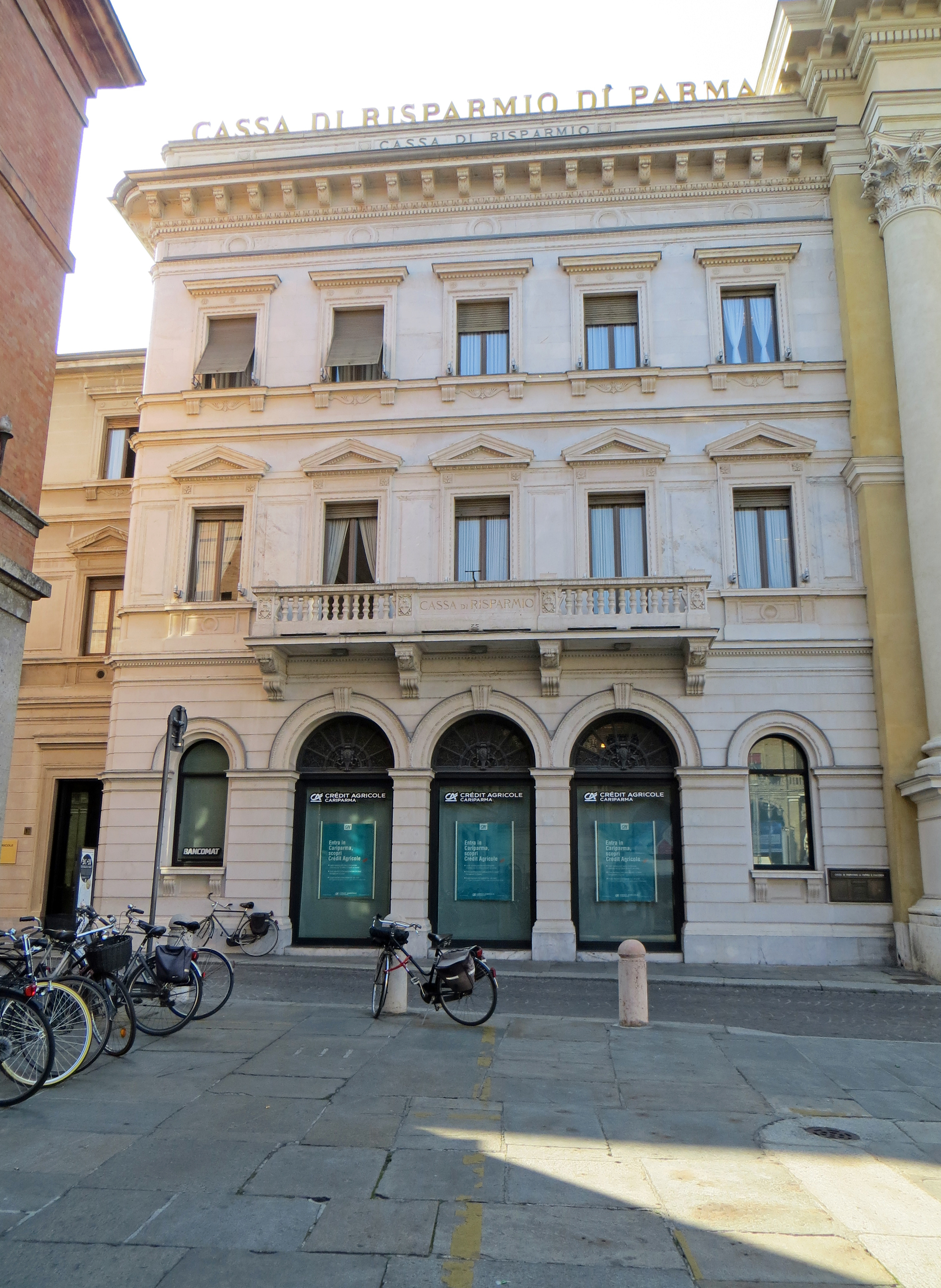
Historic head office of Cariparma

Crédit Agricole Italia S.p.A., formerly Crédit Agricole Cariparma S.p.A., is an Italian banking group, a subsidiary of French banking group Crédit Agricole. Crédit Agricole Italia was ranked as the 11th largest bank in Italy by total assets at 31 December 2015. The group serving Emilia-Romagna, Liguria and Friuli-Venezia Giulia, where the predecessors originated, as well as Campania, Lazio, Lombardy, Piedmont, Tuscany, Umbria and Veneto, or half of Italian regions.

The company was formerly known as Cassa di Risparmio di Parma e Piacenza and Cassa di Risparmio di Parma, or Cariparma in short; The banking group was formerly known as Gruppo Cariparma Crédit Agricole (Cariparma and subsidiaries Carispezia and FriulAdria). Since 2016, to eliminate the use of the three brands of the group: Cariparma, Carispezia and FriulAdria, the brand Crédit Agricole Italia was introduced. A common website www.credit-agricole.it was introduced in 2016.

Despite not a Crédit Agricole Italia subsidiary but sister company within Crédit Agricole Group, Crédit Agricole Vita places its products through Crédit Agricole Italia banking network; Crédit Agricole Corporate and Investment Bank, operated as a separate entity in Italy as a foreign company; another entity of Crédit Agricole Group (a joint venture), FCA Bank, has also signed a collaboration agreement with Crédit Agricole Italia.

== History ==
=== Foundation and early years (1859–1991) ===
Cassa di Risparmio di Parma was formed on 6 December 1859 by a decree signed by Luigi Carlo Farini. It merged with other regional bank in the last two decades, eventually became the 10th largest banking group by total assets in Italy in 2013. On 16 November 1960 the bank merged with Monte di Credito su Pegno di Busseto (Mount of Piety of Busseto).

=== As Cassa di Risparmio di Parma e Piacenza ===
In 1991, due to the reform of Italian banking system, two entities were formed, namely Fondazione Cassa di Risparmio di Parma e Monte di Credito su Pegno di Busseto (Fondazione Cariparma) and Cassa di Risparmio di Parma S.p.A., which the former served as a non-profit parent entity. In 1992 it acquired Banca Emiliana. In 1993, the bank merged with Cassa di Risparmio di Piacenza e Vigevano, which Fondazione Cariparma held 52% shares of the new company Cassa di Risparmio di Parma e Piacenza S.p.A. only. C.R. Piacenza e Vigevano itself was a merger of Cassa di Risparmio di Piacenza found 1860 and Cassa di Risparmio di Vigevano, found 1857.

In 1994 Cariparma acquired Credito Commerciale, a bank based in Lombardy region, from Monte dei Paschi di Siena. At that time Cariparma had a market share in deposit of 55.8% in the Province of Parma, 5.94% in the Province of Pavia, 1.40% in the Province of Mantua and Cremona, and 0.21% in the Province of Milan (including Monza), while Credito Commerciale had a market share of 0.13% in Parma, 4.77% in Pavia, 5.80% in Mantua, 16.94% in Cremona and 1.60% in Milan. In 2008, Cariparma still maintained a market share of 14% in the Province of Cremona.

=== Acquired by Banca Intesa ===
From 1998 to 2000 Banca Intesa gradually acquires the shares of Cariparma by exchanging the shares of Banca Intesa to Cariparma. The old "CR Parma & Piacenza" shareholder were Fondazione Cariparma, Fondazione di Piacenza e Vigevano (the parent entity of C.R. di Piacenza e Vigevano) and Società Bresciana di Partecipazioni Bancarie (a subsidiary of Banca Lombarda). In 1999, Banca Intesa reached 76.58% ownership and finally 100% in 2000. At the same time Banca Intesa also sold its minority share holding on Banca Monte Parma in August 1999 to Banca Monte dei Paschi di Siena, as well as"CR Parma & Piacenza" sold its stake in Cassa di Risparmio di Reggio Emilia for another merger.

In 1999, Mediocredito Padano was absorbed into Cariparma.

The era ended by the merger of Banca Intesa with Sanpaolo IMI, which trigger the sales of "CR Parma & Piacenza" to Crédit Agricole in 2007.

=== Acquired by Crédit Agricole ===
Old logo of Cariparma

Cariparma was acquired by Crédit Agricole in 2007. With the aid of the parent company, Cariparma acquired some branches from Italian major banking group Intesa Sanpaolo in 2007 and again in 2011. However, the parent company also started to introduce duo brand Cariparma – Crédit Agricole, which fading out the use of Cariparma.

In 2006 Banca Intesa had a proposed merge with Sanpaolo IMI (eventually the formation of Intesa Sanpaolo). Despite Banca Intesa was formed from many merger by share exchange, French banking company Crédit Agricole was the major shareholder of Banca Intesa for 17.18%, followed by Fondazione Cariplo (9.22%), Generali Group (7.54%) and Fondazione Cariparma (4.30%). Right after the merger Crédit Agricole held 9.12% shares of the new entity on 2 January 2007, but on 22 January sold 3.6% of the shares for €2.506 billion. After the sales Crédit Agricole was the third largest shareholder.

On 1 March 2007, Crédit Agricole Group through Crédit Agricole S.A. (for 75%) and SACAM International (for 10%, SACAM originally an acronym of "Société Coopérative Auxiliaire du Credit Agricole Mutuel", an auxiliary company for Crédit Agricole regional banks), partnered with Fondazione Cariparma (for 15%), acquired the entire share capital of Cariparma for €3.8 billion. At the same time, Crédit Agricole also acquired Banca Popolare FriulAdria for €836.5 million from Intesa Sanpaolo, with 23.95% shares remain held by other shareholders, as well as 202 former Banca Intesa branches for €1.3 billion. After the sales, Cariparma immediately acquired Banca Popolare FriulAdria as its subsidiaries, as well as 173 of 202 of the aforementioned branches, and the remaining 29 branches were transferred to Banca Popolare FriulAdria. After a complex deal, Cariparma acted as an intermediate holding company and head of Italian retail division of Crédit Agricole Group, which owned 78.68% stake of FriulAdria. At that time Cariparma also owned 49.99% stake of life insurance company Po Vita, which was renamed to Crédit Agricole Vita after sister company Crédit Agricole Assurances acquired the 50.01% stake in 2008 from Fondiaria-Sai.

Despite acted as the second largest shareholder of Intesa Sanpaolo by 5.8% voting rights on 31 December 2009, Crédit Agricole listed the bank as disposable asset, at the same time, the two banking group agreed to transfer some branches to Crédit Agricole, which under the ownership of Cariparma in 2010 or 2011. In 2011 the transaction was completed, which Cariparma acquired Carispezia, as well as 96 branches directly from Intesa Sanpaolo Group (11 from Banca CR Firenze to Cariparma directly; 70 of remaining 85 branches from Intesa Sanpaolo to Cariparma directly and 15 to FriulAdria), for €740 million. At the same time in the first half of 2010, Crédit Agricole reduced the share holding on Intesa Sanpaolo to 4.79% of the total share capital (4.99% voting rights). Crédit Agricole finally sold all the shares on Intesa Sanpaolo in 2012, which Cariparma became the major arm of the group participation in Italy.

In April 2012 Crédit Agricole Assurances S.A. bought the remain 49.99% share capital of Crédit Agricole Vita (CA Vita) from Cariparma for €175 million. The net asset value of 49.99% stake of CA Vita at 31 December 2011 was approx. €75.8 million (€88.9 million in 2010).

In September 2014 Crédit Agricole S.A. acquired a further 1.5% stake (13,151,424 number of shares) in Cariparma from the banking foundation for €80 million. The net asset value of 1.5% stake of Cariparma Group at 30 June 2014 was about €70 million. The shareholders' agreement was also renewed to February 2018.

=== Renamed Crédit Agricole Italia ===
In late 2016 the legal name of the bank became Crédit Agricole Cariparma S.p.A.. One unified website was also used for the three brands of the Italian banking group, as well as one brand Crédit Agricole Italia was used. The unified brand was announced in March 2016 along with other items in Crédit Agricole Group's 2016–2020 business plan.

On 21 April 2017, it was announced that Crédit Agricole Italia had started negotiating with shareholders, the Bank of Italy (regulator) and the Voluntary Scheme of Fondo Interbancario di Tutela dei Depositi to acquire Banca Carim, Cassa di Risparmio di Cesena and Cassa di Risparmio di San Miniato, three leading independent saving banks, located in Tuscany and Emilia–Romagna, which suffered from capital shortfall. On 29 September, a contract was signed. In 2018, the 3 subsidiaries were absorbed into Crédit Agricole Italia.

In November 2018, the plan to absorb subsidiary Carispezia into Crédit Agricole Italia was approved.

In november 2020, Crédit Agricole Italia launched a takeover bid for the entire share capital of Credito Valtellinese at €10.5 per share, with a premium of more than 21% compared to the last quotation and a maximum outlay of €737 million. After an increase to €12.50 per share, Crédit Agricole successfully concluded the takeover bid by acquiring 91.17% of Creval's shares for a cost of €855 million. The delisting of Credito Valtellinese from the Italian Stock Exchange took place on Friday 4 June 2021 following the success of the residual takeover bid and the consequent "squeeze-out", which led Crédit Agricole to hold 100% of the capital of Creval.

== Subsidiaries ==
=== Carispezia ===
Cassa di Risparmio della Spezia S.p.A. (Carispezia) was acquired in 2010 from Intesa Sanpaolo. In 2010 the bank group had 76 branches in Liguria, Tuscany and Emilia-Romagna. Fondazione Carispezia was the minority shareholder.

=== FriulAdria ===
Banca Popolare FriulAdria S.p.A. (FriulAdria) was acquired from Intesa Sanpaolo in 2007.

=== Crédit Agricole Leasing Italia ===
Crédit Agricole Leasing Italia S.r.l. (CALIT) was formed in 2008, which served as the lease finance arm of Crédit Agricole Group in Italy. Crédit Agricole acquired a subsidiary of Leasint, from Intesa Sanpaolo as the predecessor of CALIT. In September 2009 Crédit Agricole sold 85% shares of CALIT to Cariparma, with 15% retained by the parent company. Leasint itself was a product of merger.

== See also ==
- Cassa di Risparmio in Bologna (Carisbo), a short lived sister bank (January to February 2007) based in Bologna, Emilia-Romagna
- Banca Monte Parma, a defunct banking subsidiary of Intesa Sanpaolo, based in Parma
- List of banks in Italy
