= Cassa di Risparmio di San Miniato =

Italian savings bank

- Native name: Cassa di Risparmio di San Miniato S.p.A.
- Company type: subsidiary
- Industry: Financial services
- Founded: 27 April 1830; 13 April 1992 (as S.p.A.)
- Founder: Mons. Torello Pierazzi
- Defunct: 2018
- Fate: absorbed into parent company
- Headquarters: San Miniato, Italy
- Number of locations: ▼80 branches (2016)
Area served
Tuscany region	(78 branches)
Milan, Lombardy	(1 branch)
Rome, Lazio	(1 branch)
Key people
Alessandro Bandini	(chairman)
Alberto Lang	(vice-chairman)
Divo Gronchi	(CEO)
- Services: Retail banking
- Net income: ▲ (€47 million) (2016)
- Total assets: ▼€2,810 million (2016)
- Total equity: ▼€143 million (2016)
- Owner: Crédit Agricole Italia
- Parent: Crédit Agricole Italia
- Subsidiaries: San Genesio Immobiliare
- Capital ratio: ▼6.05% (Group CET1, Dec.2016)
- Website: www.carismi.it
- Footnotes / references in consolidated financial statement

Cassa di Risparmio di San Miniato S.p.A. (Carismi) was an Italian savings bank based in San Miniato, in the Province of Pisa, Tuscany. It was taken over by Crédit Agricole via its Crédit Agricole Italia division.

== History ==
Cassa di Risparmio di San Miniato was found on 27 April 1830 in the Grand Duchy of Tuscany, a year after the savings bank of Florence, the oldest savings bank in Tuscany region. On 14 January 1886, the savings bank was gained an independent status by a royal decree (part away from Florence).

Due to Legge Amato, the bank was split into a company limited by shares (società per azioni) and a banking foundation (Ente Cassa di Risparmio di San Miniato, later renamed to Fondazione Cassa di Risparmio di San Miniato) on 13 April 1992 (gazetted on 14 May). The bank immediately sold about 70% shares of the bank to Holding Casse Toscane (literally Tuscan Savings Banks), a new intermediate holding company for the savings bank (Italian: Cassa di Risparmio) of San Miniato, Florence, Livorno, Lucca, Pisa, Pistoia–Pescia, and Banca del Monte di Lucca. The ente received about 12% shares of Casse Toscane in return, making the ente had a minority interests in other banks, but only hold about 30% shares of their own bank directly or about 38.4% combined.

In March 1998 Pistoia–Pescia and San Miniato withdrew from Casse Toscane, after Lucca, Pisa, Livorno and BM Lucca left in 1995 (forming Casse del Tirreno); A minority interests of 25% was sold to another Tuscan bank Banca Monte dei Paschi di Siena (Banca MPS) in 1999, with the ente retained the remain 75% (Finanziaria CRSM S.p.A., a wholly owned subsidiary of the ente, owned about 62.83% shares of the bank, which was renamed to Grifoni CRSM S.p.A.). From 1997 to 1999, San Miniato was the third largest bank in the Province of Pisa, with an average market share of 18.5% in terms of deposits. However, after alliance with Banca MPS, the group was the largest bank in the province, suppressing Casse del Tirreno (about 24.4%) and Cassa di Risparmio di Volterra (about 10%).

As of 2015, insurance company Cattolica Assicurazioni hold around 25% shares of the bank. The banking foundation through direct and indirectly ownership (Grifoni CRSM S.p.A.), held 54.77% shares, as the largest shareholder.

In 2016 a proposed capital increase of €55 million was announced. On 28 April 2017, it was announced the bank was discussed with Crédit Agricole Italia and the Voluntary Scheme of Fondo Interbancario di Tutela dei Depositi (FITD) and the Bank of Italy (as regulator), for a possible takeover by Crédit Agricole with the aid of FITD. In 2017 it was announced that Crédit Agricole Italia has interested to acquire the bank, which a process of due diligence was started in the same year. A contract was signed on 29 September, with FITD voluntary scheme was responsible to recapitalize and clean up the non-performing loans before handover.

In 2018, it was announced that the bank would be absorbed into Crédit Agricole Italia, ending its history as a separate entity.

== Equity investments ==
The bank owned a minority interest (20% of share capital) of Cassa di Risparmio di Volterra, with an additional 5% share capital were owned by the banking foundation of C.R. San Miniato.

== Sponsorship ==
The bank was a sponsor of local football club A.C. Tuttocuoio 1957 San Miniato.

== See also ==
- List of banks in Italy
