= Banca Leonardo =

Italian investment bank

- Company type: Società per azioni S.p.A
- Industry: Financial services
- Founded: 1999; 26 years ago in Milan
- Headquarters: Milan, Italy
- Number of locations: Wealth Management: Milan, Florence, Lecco, Padua, Rome, Turin.
- Key people: Ariberto Fassati (chairman); Marco Migliore (CEO and GM)
- Services: wealth management
- Owner: Indosuez Wealth Management (99.8%)
- Website: www.bancaleonardo.com/en

Banca Leonardo was an Italian independent investment bank until its merger with Indosuez Wealth Management in 2019. Based in Milan, it operated through its own brand and through its subsidiaries with a focus on the wealth management business in Italy.

== History ==
Banca Leonardo S.p.A. was founded in Milan in October 1999.

In April 2006, a group of leading European investors acquired and recapitalised Banca Leonardo with the purpose of creating the first private and independent investment bank in Italy and becoming the market leader through consulting services, a long-term individual approach, value-added services, professionalism, and expertise.

In July 2007, Banca Leonardo acquired a stake in Toulouse & Associés, a French investment bank led by Jean-Baptiste Toulouse and Jean Peyrelevade. It then acquired the rest of the shares it did not own in Toulouse & Associés in September 2008.

In October 2015, the group sold its investment bank activities in Belgium, Germany, Italy and Spain to Houlihan Lokey. While offices in Belgium, Germany and Spain now operate under the Houlihan Lokey brand, the Italian office has retained the Leonardo & Co. brand. In May 2015, the group sold its investment banking activities in France to Natixis.

In December 2016, the group sold its French private banking activities to UBS France.

In May 2018, 94.1% of the shareholding of Banca Leonardo was acquired by Indosuez Wealth Management, a subsidiary of Groupe Crédit Agricole. The merger between Indosuez Wealth Management and Banca Leonardo was completed in October 2019, with the creation of CA Indosuez Wealth (Italy).
