= Banca del Monte di Lucca =

Italian bank

- Formerly: Monte di Credito su Pegno di Lucca; Monte di Pietà dal Governo della Repubblica Lucchese
- Company type: subsidiary
- Industry: Financial services
- Founded: 1489 (as mount of piety); 1992 (current legal person)
- Headquarters: Lucca, Italy
Owner
Banca Carige	(60%)
Fondazione Banca del Monte di Lucca	(20%)
Fondazione Cassa di Risparmio di Lucca	(20%)
- Parent: Banca Carige

Banca del Monte di Lucca S.p.A. is an Italian bank. It was related to charity organization Fondazione Banca del Monte di Lucca until the 1990s, when the organizations were separated.

== Bank ==
The predecessor of the bank, a mount of piety (Italian: monte di pietà), was founded in 1489. The bank was later changed the denomination to Monte di Credito su Pegno di Lucca due to a banking reform, despite the "Monte" reflected the mount of piety root.

Due to another banking reform in 1990s (it:Legge Amato), the larger organization was split into a società per azioni and a separate banking foundation in 1992.

Banca Monte Lucca, and the savings banks of Florence, Livorno, Lucca, Pisa, Pistoia, San Miniato, also formed a loose banking group: Holding Casse Toscane in the same year. In 1996, CR Pisa, Livorno, Lucca and Banca Monte Lucca quit the group and formed Holding Casse del Tirreno. In 1999 the three savings banks were acquired by Banca Popolare di Lodi. In 2000 Banca Carige acquired 51% shares of Banca Monte Lucca S.p.A.. The foundation sold a further 20% in 2013 to Fondazione Cassa di Risparmio di Lucca.

== Banking foundation ==
The former majority owner of the bank, Fondazione Banca del Monte di Lucca, was a minority owner of Cassa Depositi e Prestiti for 114,348 shares. The foundation also owned 0.1545% of Banca Carige.

The foundation also sponsored arts exhibitions in the United States.
