= Cassa di Risparmio di Prato =

Former Italian bank

- Trade name: Cariprato
- Company type: subsidiary; società per azioni
- Industry: Financial services
- Founded: 1830; 1992 (S.p.A. and foundation spin-off
- Founder: Giovacchino Benini
- Defunct: 2010
- Fate: bank business absorbed by parent company BPVi; charity functions continued by a spin-off foundation since 1992
- Successor: BPVi branches; Fondazione Cariprato
- Headquarters: Prato, Italy
- Services: retail banking; corporate banking
- Owner: Banca Popolare di Vicenza
- Parent: Banca Popolare di Vicenza

Cassa di Risparmio di Prato S.p.A. or known as Cariprato or C.R. Prato, is a former Italian saving bank based in Prato, Tuscany. It was acquired by Banca Popolare di Vicenza (BPVi) in 2003. In 2010 it was completely absorbed by the parent company as its own branded branches.

The former owner of the bank, Fondazione Cariprato, as of 31 December 2013, still owned 0.5% shares of BPVi. However, in January 2015 the foundation also announced that they would diversify their investments by decreasing the shares holding on one company.

== History ==
Cassa di Risparmio di Prato was found in 1830 in the Grand Duchy of Tuscany, a year after the formation of Cassa di Risparmio di Firenze. The bank gained an independent status (part away from C.R. Firenze) on 13 October 1882. Cariprato was the first bank that bail-out by Fondo Interbancario di Tutela dei Depositi in 1988, which the bank was acquired by Banca Monte dei Paschi di Siena (Banca MPS).

In 1992, due to Legge Amato the bank was divided into società per azioni (limited company) and Fondazione Cariprato (a banking foundation). In 1995 a new legal person for the bank was incorporated, which the banking foundation only owned 21% shares. Banca MPS sold the controlling interests (79%) to Banca Popolare di Vicenza in March 2003 for €411.2 million. Due to the 2010 complete takeover, the foundation gained about 0.5% shares of BPVi (347,459 number of shares of BPVi with €60.5 unit price, plus €33,378,513.5 cash for 13% Cariprato shares) as well as €33,440,000 for the remaining 8%. The takeover also caused a minor conservatory, which the arts collection of Cariprato had moved to Vicenza instead of remained in Prato.

== Banking foundation ==
Fondazione Cassa di Risparmio di Prato or Fondazione Cariprato currently is a charity organization. The foundation failed to elect the board of director in 2013.

== See also ==
- Palazzo degli Alberti, former headquarter
- Banca CR Firenze
- Cassa di Risparmio di Carrara
- Cassa di Risparmio di Lucca Pisa Livorno
- List of banks in Italy
