= Azione di Risparmio (Italy) =

Italian share

Azioni di risparmio are "savings shares", Italian securities that are only issued by listed Italian companies. They differ from ordinary shares in two ways: first, the savings shareholder does not have the right to vote either at ordinary or extraordinary shareholder meetings; second, the savings shareholders earn a higher dividend than ordinary shareholders. They are therefore analogous to preferred shares. Savings shares, like any other type of share without voting rights in Italian shareholders' meetings, may be issued for up to 50% of a company's share capital.

These shares therefore appeal to the so-called "cassettisti", investors who buy a share for its annual dividends rather than for price appreciation and who are less interested in the dynamics of the business's management.

== Change of company structure ==
A company that issues savings shares is required to change its internal organizational structure; two entities are established to protect the interests of these shareholders:

- A "Special Assembly", which must approve resolutions of shareholder general meetings if they prejudice the rights of saving shareholders.
- A "Common Representative": an institutional appointee that provides for the implementation of the resolutions of extraordinary shareholder meetings, and has the right to attend general meetings.
