= Banca CR Firenze =

Former Italian bank

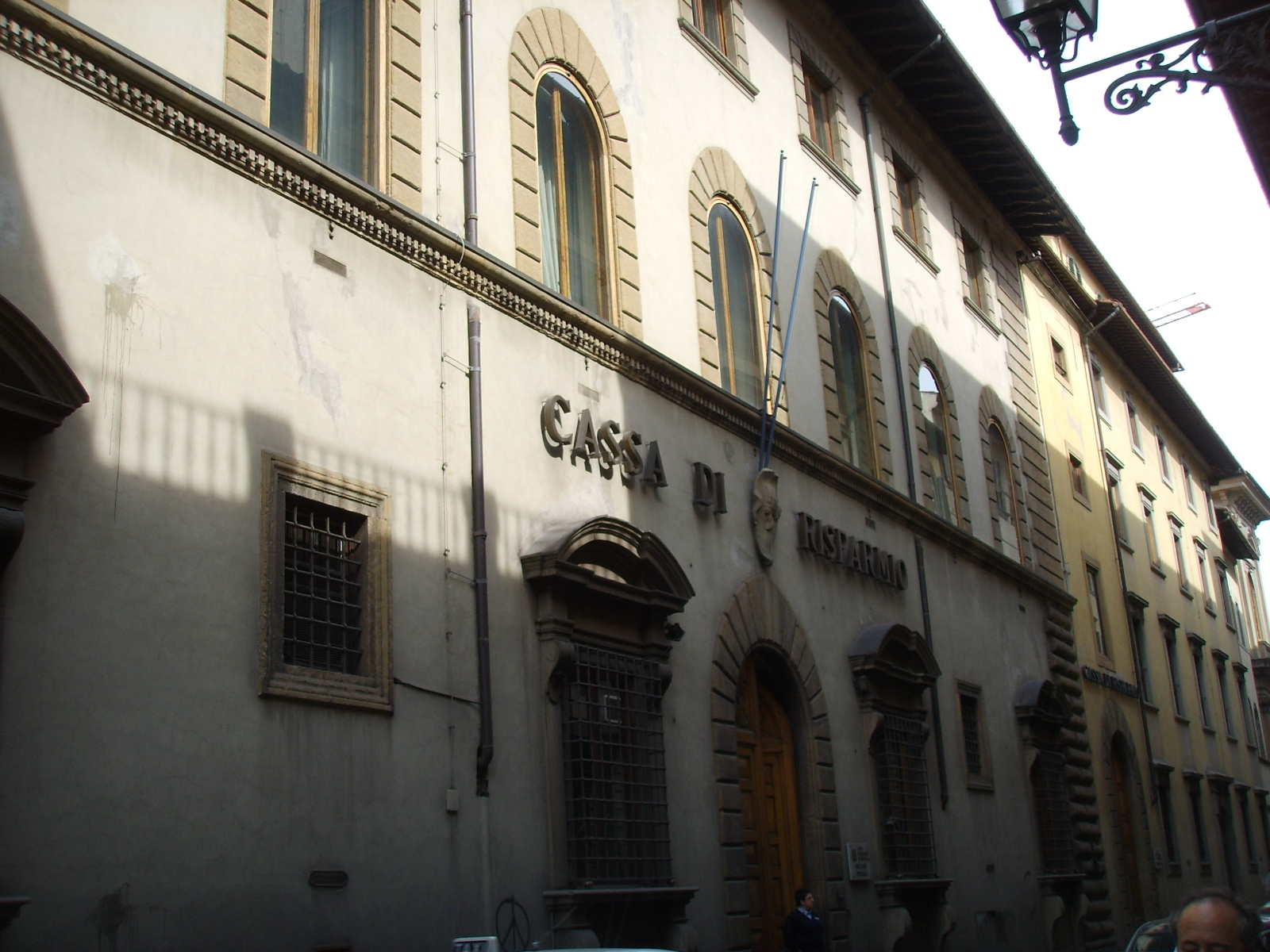
- Native name: Banca Cassa di Risparmio di Firenze S.p.A.
- Type: Subsidiary of a listed company (formerly listed company itself)
- Industry: Financial services
- Founded: 1829; 197 years ago 1992; 34 years ago(S.p.A.)
- Successor: Ente Cassa di Risparmio di Firenze (charity only)
- Headquarters: via Bufalini 4, Florence, Italy
- Key people: Giuseppe Morbidelli (president)
- Services: Retail and corporate banking
- Net income: ▲€25,921,686 (2015)
- Total assets: ▼€11,581,214,647 (2015)
- Total equity: ▼€659,340,135 (2015)
- Owner: Intesa Sanpaolo (100%)
- Parent: Intesa Sanpaolo
- Subsidiaries: Caripistoia (74.88%)
- Website: http://www.bancacrfirenze.it
- Footnotes in separate financial statements

Banca Cassa di Risparmio di Firenze S.p.A. known as Banca CR Firenze, was an Italian savings bank. Once a listed company, the group now part of Intesa Sanpaolo since 2007.

== History ==
Cassa di Risparmio di Firenze (The Saving Bank of Florence) was found on 30 March 1829. The bank was the central saving bank of the Grand Duchy of Tuscany. However, some banks, such as saving banks from San Miniato, had gained independence from Florence after their establishment.

=== Casse Toscane ===
In 1992, due to Legge Amato, the banking operation and the ownership were separated into a società per azioni and banking foundation Ente Cassa di Risparmio di Firenze.

In 1992 the bank also formed a common holding company Casse Toscane for the Saving Bank of Florence, Livorno, Pisa, Pistoia–Pescia, San Miniato and Banca del Monte di Lucca. Ente Cassa di Risparmio di Firenze was the largest shareholders of the holding company.

However, after 1996, the holding company contained only Florence, Pistoia–Pescia and San Miniato, as 4 members banks withdrew to form Casse del Tirreno. In 1998, the shares of Pistoia–Pescia and San Miniato also sold back to their banking foundations. But a year later, Florence Saving Bank bought 51% shares of Pistoia–Pescia Saving Bank.

The significant interests of the saving banks of Civitavecchia and Orvieto were also acquired in the late 1990s. After multiple deals, Banca CR Firenze reached 51% ownership of Civitavecchia and 51.575% of Orvieto in 2000.

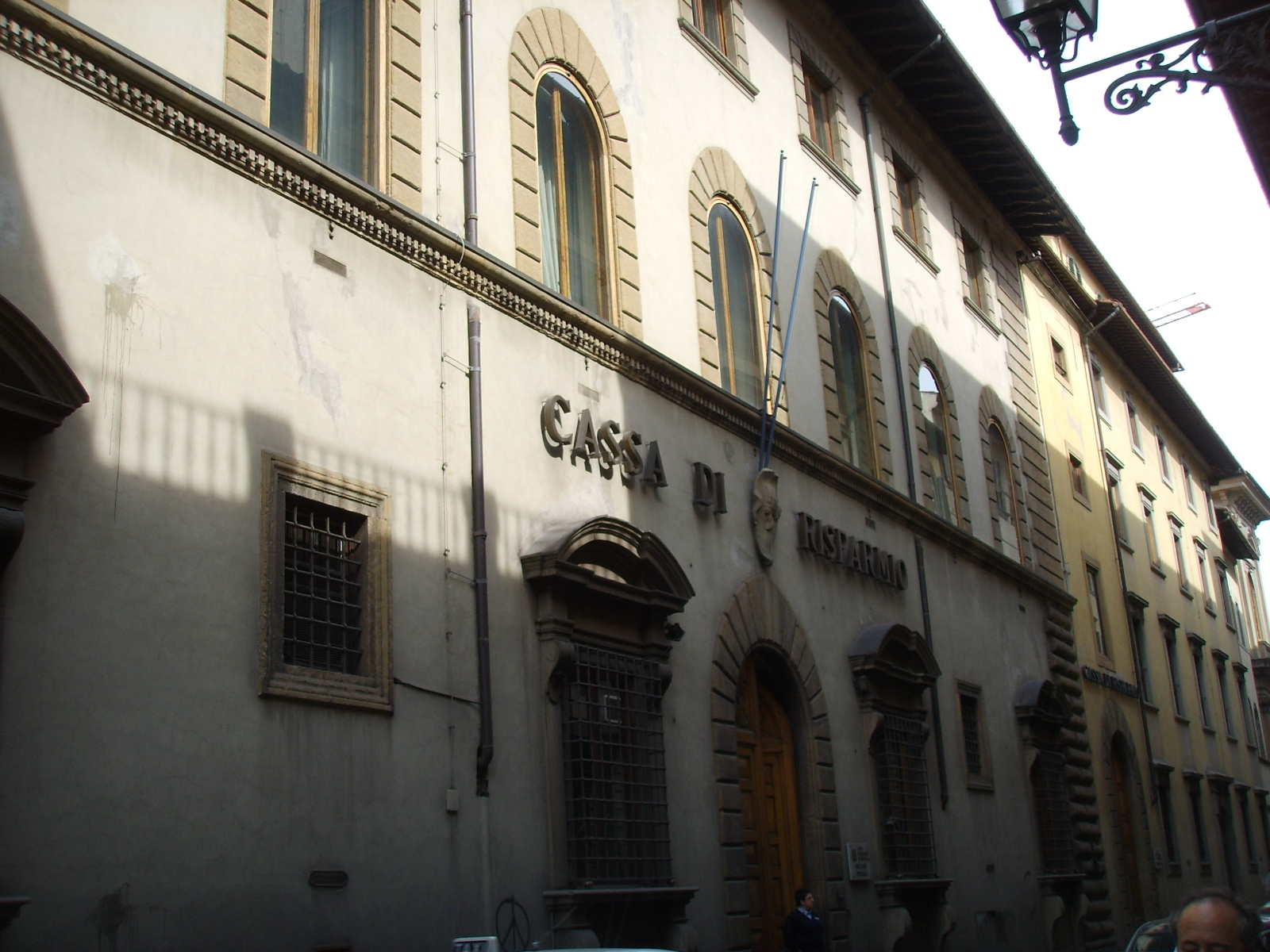
old headquarter at via Bufalini 6 (Ente headquarter)

=== Listed company ===
In November 1999 the ente sold some of the shares of the bank to Sanpaolo IMI and BNP Paribas. In 2000 the bank became a listed company in Borsa Italiana, with the ente owned 50% shares only. At the end of 2000, Ente CR Firenze owned 43.18%, Sanpaolo IMI owned 19.09%, BNP Paribas owned 6.99%, Ente of Pistoia & Pescia Saving Bank owned 3.95%, Banca Carige 0.82% and Cassa di Risparmio di Padova e Rovigo owned 0.82%, 25.15% held by the public. However Ente CR Firenze also owned 2.57% shares of Sanpaolo IMI as the 6th largest shareholder, which made the ente directly and indirectly held 43.67% interests on Banca CR Firenze SpA, but not voting rights.

In 2000 the group acquired Cassa di Risparmio di Mirandola, which reached 99.962% ownership in 2005. In June 2001 the group acquired a minority share holding of Cassa dei Risparmi di Forlì, which reached 12.75% in December 2005. In August 2001 Credito Fondiario Toscano was absorbed into the group. In December 2001 the group increased the shares holding of Findomestic Banca from 35% to 50%.

In 2003 the bank acquired Cassa di Risparmio della Spezia (Carispezia) from Banca Intesa and Fondazione Carispezia by cash and shares exchange. The ownership ratio reached 80% in 2006.

In March 2006 the group acquired Romanian bank Banca Daewoo S.A. and renamed into Banca CR Firenze Romania S.A.. In 2006 Mirandola was absorbed into Banca CR Firenze.

=== Privatization by Intesa Sanpaolo ===
However, in July 2007 the group was being acquired by Intesa Sanpaolo. Before the completion of the acquisition and privatization in 2008, The ente was a significant shareholder for 41.925% shares, with Intesa Sanpaolo being the second largest shareholder of 18.570% shares, followed by BNP Paribas (6.547%), Fondazione Carispezia (3.909%), Foundation of Pistoia & Pescia Saving Bank (renamed from Ente to Fondazione in late 1990s) (3.680%) and Società Finanziaria di Banche Romagnole (1.088%), about 24.281% shares were held by the public. After the merger the "ente" became the 7th largest shareholder of Intesa Sanpaolo (3.378%), due to the swap ratio of 1.194 Intesa Sanpaolo ordinary shares for each Banca CR Firenze share, while Intesa Sanpaolo owned 89.71% shares of Banca CR Firenze. That made "Ente" owned about 13.3% interests on Banca CR Firenze directly and indirectly, but not in voting rights.

The merger also triggered the demerging of Banca CR Firenze's subsidiaries, which CR Orvieto (located in Umbria region) and 4 former Banca CR Firenze branches were sold to Banca Popolare di Bari in 2009, as well as Findomestic Bank was sold to BNP Paribas from 2009 to 2011.

However Intesa Casse del Centro, previously under directly ownership of Intesa Sanpaolo (96.07% ownership), was sold to Banca CR Firenze, made Banca CR Firenze had access to the saving banks of the Province of Viterbo, Ascoli, Città di Castello, Spoleto, Rieti, Foligno, Terni and Narni. (4 from Umbria, 2 from Lazio, 1 from Marche) Soon later the intermediate holding company Casse del Centro was dissolved.

In 2010 Intesa Sanpaolo spin off with French banking group Crédit Agricole, which Carispezia was sold to the French banking group, as well as 11 former Banca CR Firenze branches were sold to Crédit Agricole's subsidiary in Italy, Cariparma.

In 2012 the local saving banks were reorganized by selling relevant branches to matching subsidiaries, both within Banca CR Firenze and within Intesa Sanpaolo. On 26 November 2012 subsidiary Casse di Risparmio dell'Umbria was formed by the merger of Foligno, Città di Castello, Terni e Narni and Spoleto saving banks, with CR Spoleto was renamed to CR Umbria.

On 23 July 2012 CR Pistoia e Pescia was renamed to Cassa di Risparmio di Pistoia e della Lucchesia. On 12 November 2012 Ascoli Piceno was sold back to Intesa Sanpaolo after Banca CR Firenze acquired 100% shares. On 1 October 2012 Banca CR Firenze Romania S.A. was merged with Banca Comercialà Intesa Sanpaolo Romania S.A., which Banca CR Firenze hold 8.18% of B.C. Intesa Sanpaolo Romania immediately after the deal.

In 2015 subsidiaries CR Viterbo, Rieti and Civitavecchia were closed down. The shares of the saving banks were exchanged with the shares of Intesa Sanpaolo. In the same year Ente Cassa di Risparmio di Firenze also excised a put option to sell the minority stake (10.26%) in the bank to Intesa Sanpaolo for €182.5 million. After the deal the former owner of Banca CR Firenze, would just own about 2% shares of Intesa Sanpaolo directly as well as the same ratio indirectly in Banca CR Firenze.

In November 2015 Casse dell'Umbria was sold back to the parent company by reduction of the share capital and reserve of Banca CR Firenze.

== Current wholly owned subsidiaries ==
As of 31 December 2015

- Cassa di Risparmio di Pistoia e della Lucchesia, Tuscany region, 74.88%
- Infogroup S.c.p.A., Florence, 65.45%

== See also ==
- Cassa di Risparmio di Lucca Pisa Livorno
- List of banks in Italy
