= Banca Carige =

Italian bank based in Genoa, Italy

Banca Carige S.p.A.

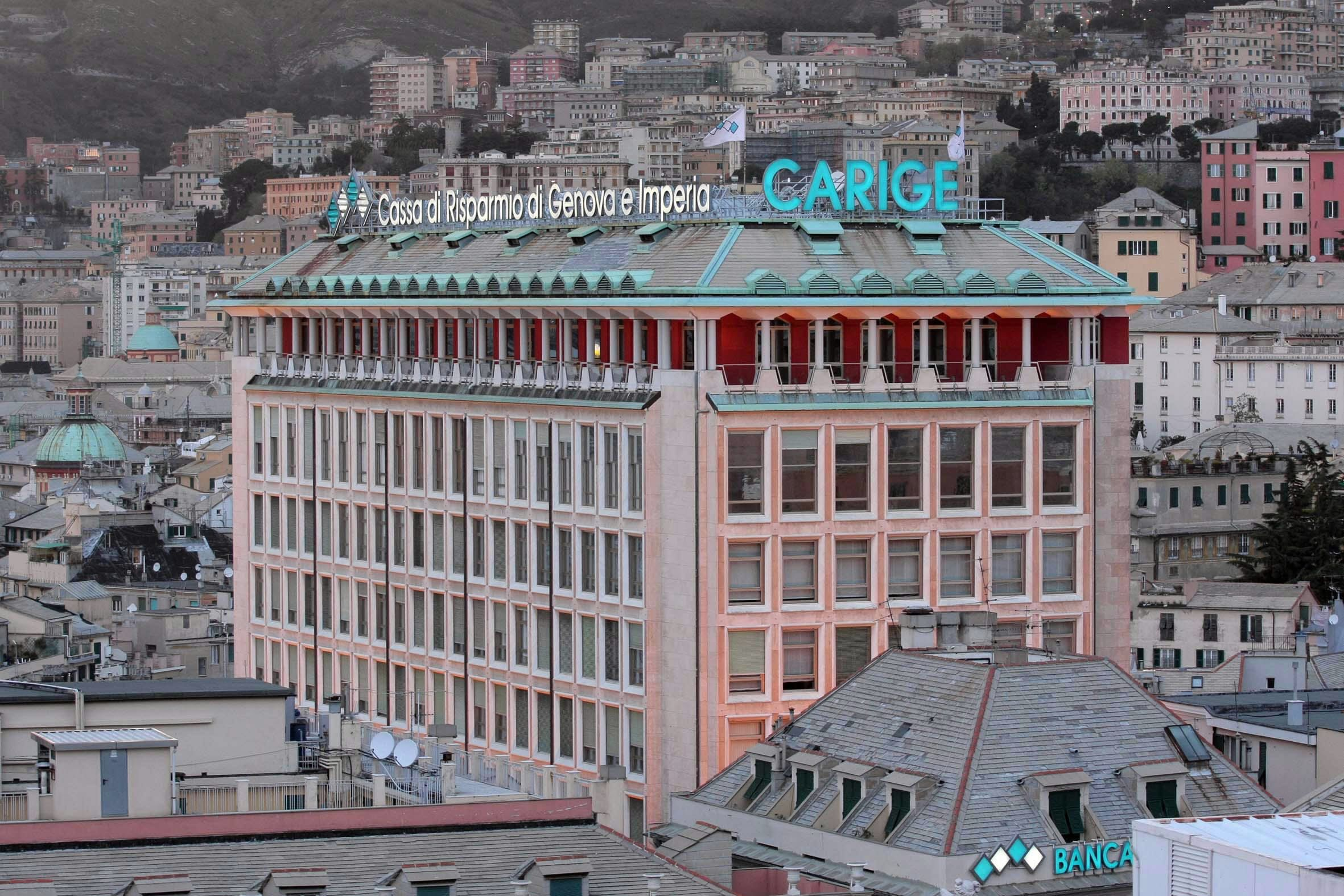
- Formerly: Cassa di Risparmio di Genova; Cassa di Risparmio di Genova e Imperia
- Company type: listed
- Traded as: BIT: CRG
- ISIN: IT0005108763
- Industry: Financial services
- Founded: 1483; 543 years ago (mount of piety, Genoa); 1991; 35 years ago
- Fate: On 28 November 2022, the bank was incorporated into BPER Banca.
- Headquarters: Genoa, Italy
- Number of locations: ▼529 (2017)
Key people
Pietro Modiano
Fabio Innocenzi
- Services: Retail banking; Corporate banking; Private banking; Investment banking
- Net income: ▼€−388.4 million (2017)
- Total assets: ▼€24,919.7 million (2017)
- Total equity: ▲€2,244.7 million (2017)
- Owner: BPER Banca
- Number of employees: ▼4,642 (2017)
- Capital ratio: ▲12.4% (Group CET1, Dec.2017)
- Website: www.gruppocarige.it
- Footnotes / references in consolidated financial statement

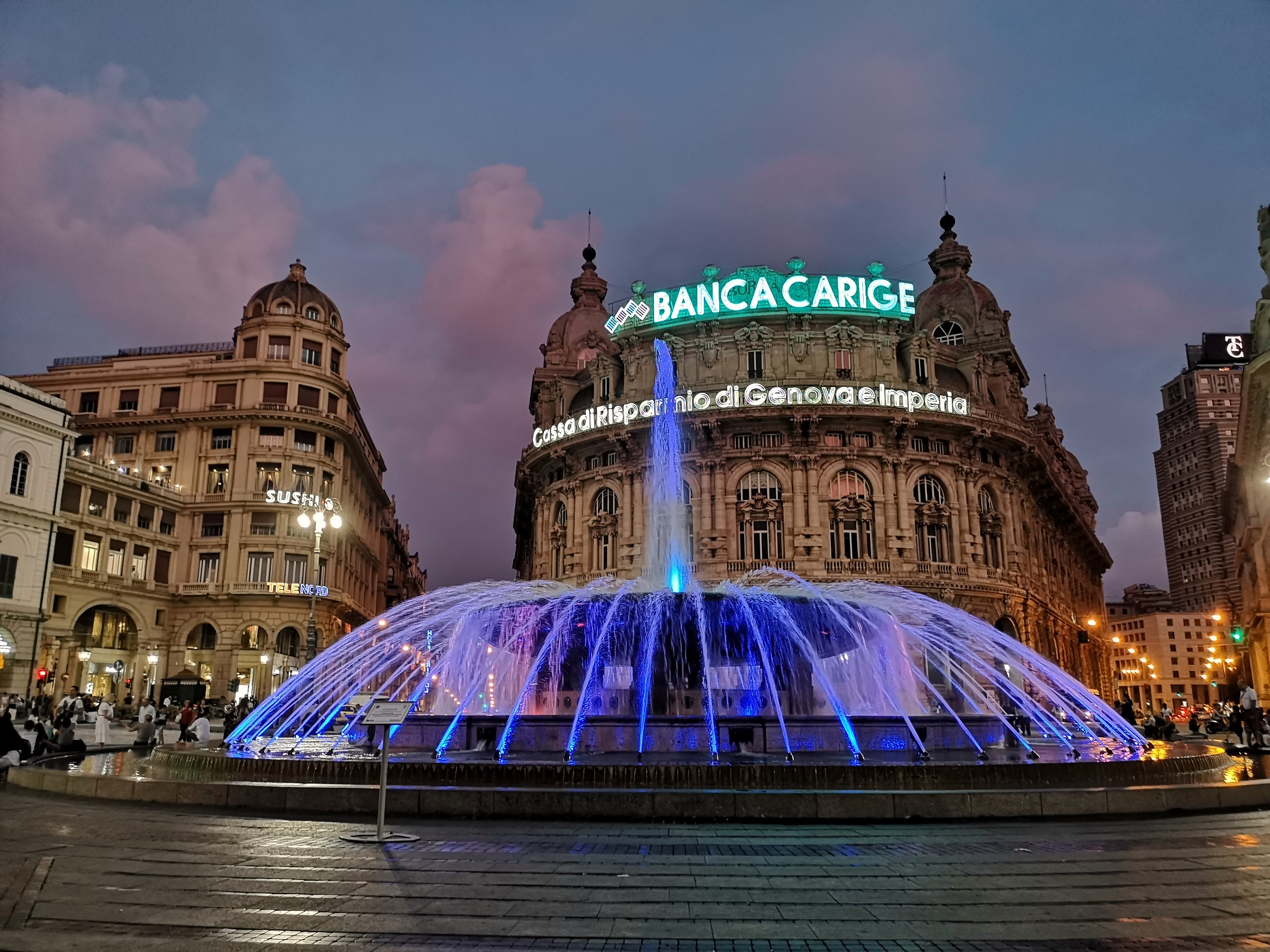
Fontana di Piazza De Ferrari and Banca Carige lit up at night

Banca Carige S.p.A., historically known as Cassa di Risparmio di Genova e Imperia (Ca.Ri.Ge.) was an Italian bank based in Genoa, with more than 500 bank branches in Italy, prior to its acquisition by BPER Banca in February 2022. The predecessor of the bank, a mount of piety, was founded in 1483 in Genoa, the Republic of Genoa. Banca Carige and its subsidiaries were known as Banca Carige Group (Italian: Gruppo Banca Carige). The banking group was one of the large banking groups in Italy, and as such, was supervised by the European Central Bank. In 2017, the banking group had 529 branches throughout Italy, with one branch in Nice, France, about 37.2% of branches were located in the home region Liguria. In November 2022, Banca Carige was fully incorporated into BPER Banca and ceased to exist as a separate entity.

== History ==
=== 1483–1990: early years ===
In 1483, the Franciscan religious Angelo Da Chivasso, founded the mount of piety (Italian: Monte di Pietà) of Genoa. In 1846, a decree of Piedmont-Sardinia King Charles Albert of Sardinia created the Cassa di Risparmio di Genova, which extended the basic financial services of the mount to encourage and protect small savings more widely. In the 19th century, the bank expanded into western Liguria, and in 1967, it became the Cassa di Risparmio di Genova e Imperia. Imperia was the capital of the west-most province of Liguria region.

=== 1991–1999 ===
In 1991, due to Amato Law, the bank, as a statutory corporation, was split into Banca Carige S.p.A. and Fondazione Carige, forming Gruppo Banca Carige in the same year. The bank absorbed Istituto di Credito Fondiario della Liguria and Mediocredito Ligure. In January 1995, Banca Carige entered into the Borsa Italiana as a listed company. In 1997, the Gruppo Banca Carige acquired some insurance companies.

=== 2000–2013: Berneschi's Bank Management ===
In 2000, Carige Vita Nuova Assicurazioni was created from Basilese Vita Nuova, while in 2002, Carige Assicurazioni was founded from Levante Norditalia. In 2000, the Banca Carige Group acquired the Cassa di Risparmio di Savona and the Banca del Monte di Lucca. Between 2000 and 2002, Carige completed three further acquisitions of branches from other banks: 21 branches from Banco di Sicilia, 61 from Banca Intesa group, and 42 from the Capitalia Group in Piedmont, Lombardy, Veneto, Emilia–Romagna, Tuscany, Lazio, Marche, Umbria, Apulia, and Sicily. In 2004, the bank strengthened its position in Tuscany with the acquisition of the Cassa di Risparmio di Carrara and founded Carige Asset Management SGR for the management of financial products. In 2004, the bank acquired the private bank Banca Cesare Ponti. In 2008, two further major acquisitions were completed: 79 branches from the Intesa Sanpaolo Group in Aosta Valley, Piedmont, Lombardy, Veneto, and Sardinia, and another 38 branches from the UniCredit Group in Lazio, Sicily, Emilia–Romagna, Veneto, and Umbria. In 2010, the bank acquired another 22 branches from Banca Monte dei Paschi di Siena.

In September 2013, the Bank of Italy (Italian central bank) blamed Carige for using accountancy tricks and being in a difficult situation due to derivatives the bank had bought from Deutsche Bank. Carige published a statement to explain the event. The Bank of Italy demanded from Carige a new business plan by the end of October. In 2013, the bank sold its asset management subsidiary to ARCA SGR for €101 million.

=== 2014–2019 ===
In 2014, the bank sold its insurance subsidiaries Carige Assicurazioni and Carige Vita Nuova to investment funds managed by Apollo Global Management for €310 million (via Primavera Holdings S.r.l.). However, in 2016 the new board of directors wanted to sue the old managers for mismanagement by selling the insurance companies, claiming it was actually harmful to the bank instead of gain. However, the court rejected the lawsuit.

In mid-2015, subsidiaries Cassa di Risparmio di Savona (with second-tier subsidiary Immobiliare Carisa), Cassa di Risparmio di Carrara, Columbus Carige Immobiliare were absorbed into Banca Carige. In 2016 Banca Carige Italia was absorbed by Banca Carige.

Around 2015, Malacalza Investimenti replaced Fondazione Carige, as the largest shareholder of the bank.

The Banca Carige Chairman Giuseppe Tesauro resigned on 26 June 2018. Vittorio Malacalza, representing the majority shareholder of the bank: Malacalza Investimenti, also resigned as a director in July. In total, 8 directors, or the majority of the board excluding CEO Paolo Fiorentino, had resigned in mid-2018. However, in the re-election of the whole board, Malacalza Investimenti, secured a majority of the new board for 7 seats, as well as hiring Fabio Innocenzi as the new CEO.

In September 2018, Carige also followed the peer to sell their merchant acquiring business to Nexi.

In November 2018, the bank was bailed out by the voluntary arm of the Fondo Interbancario di Tutela dei Depositi (FITD). The voluntary arm of FITD was funded by some of the Italian banks, which partially underwritten (€318.2 million, plus 1.8 million from non-member of the voluntary arm: Banco di Desio e della Brianza) the issue of the Tier 2 subordinated bonds of Carige of a size of €400 million in order to boost its capital.

On 2 January 2019, the European Central Bank appointed administrators including former Chairman Pietro Modiano and CEO Fabio Innocenzi (who resigned in December 2018), to run the bank after they were unable to raise €400 million of new share capital at the end of 2018. The board of directors, controlled by Malacalza Investimenti, rejected the proposed capital increase in December 2018. It was reported that BlackRock once interested in acquiring the bank, but withdrew from the negotiation in May 2019. Another bid from Apollo Global Management, however, was rejected by FITD.

=== 2020–2022 ===
During the COVID-19 pandemic, the bank's top management was looking for a buyer who could put an end to the banking crisis that the bank has been through in the previous decade. On 14 February 2022, the purchase negotiation by BPER Banca was concluded, with the approval of the Fondo Interbancario di Tutela dei Depositi (FITD). Furthermore, the FITD guaranteed to Carige other funds for a total €530 million. On 28 November 2022, the bank was incorporated into BPER Banca. The Monte di Pietà of Genoa is sold to Affide, a brand of Custodia Valore - Credito su Pegno S.p.A. and from 2022 part of it.

== Structure ==
As of 31 December 2017, the Gruppo Banca Carige was a financial group composed of the Banca del Monte di Lucca, Banca Cesare Ponti and Creditis Servizi Finanziari and other subsidiaries. According to CONSOB data, the main shareholders of Gruppo Banca Carige on 26 December 2019 were:

Rank	Name	Percentage	Substantial shareholders
1	Fondo Interbancario di Tutela dei Depositi	79.992%	
2	Compania Financiera Lonestar	9.087%	Gabriele Volpi
3	Cassa Centrale Banca	8.341%	

The original majority owner of the bank, Fondazione Carige, now owns < 2%.

== Controversies ==
The former Banca Carige Chairman Giovanni Berneschi had been sentenced to 8 years of imprisonment by an Italian Court in July 2018, due to a fraud that related to the bank. However, the case was re-trialed after the Supreme Court of Cassation ruled that the case should be heard in Milan instead of Genoa.

== See also ==
- List of banks in Italy
