= Crédit Agricole =

French financial services company

Crédit Agricole S.A.

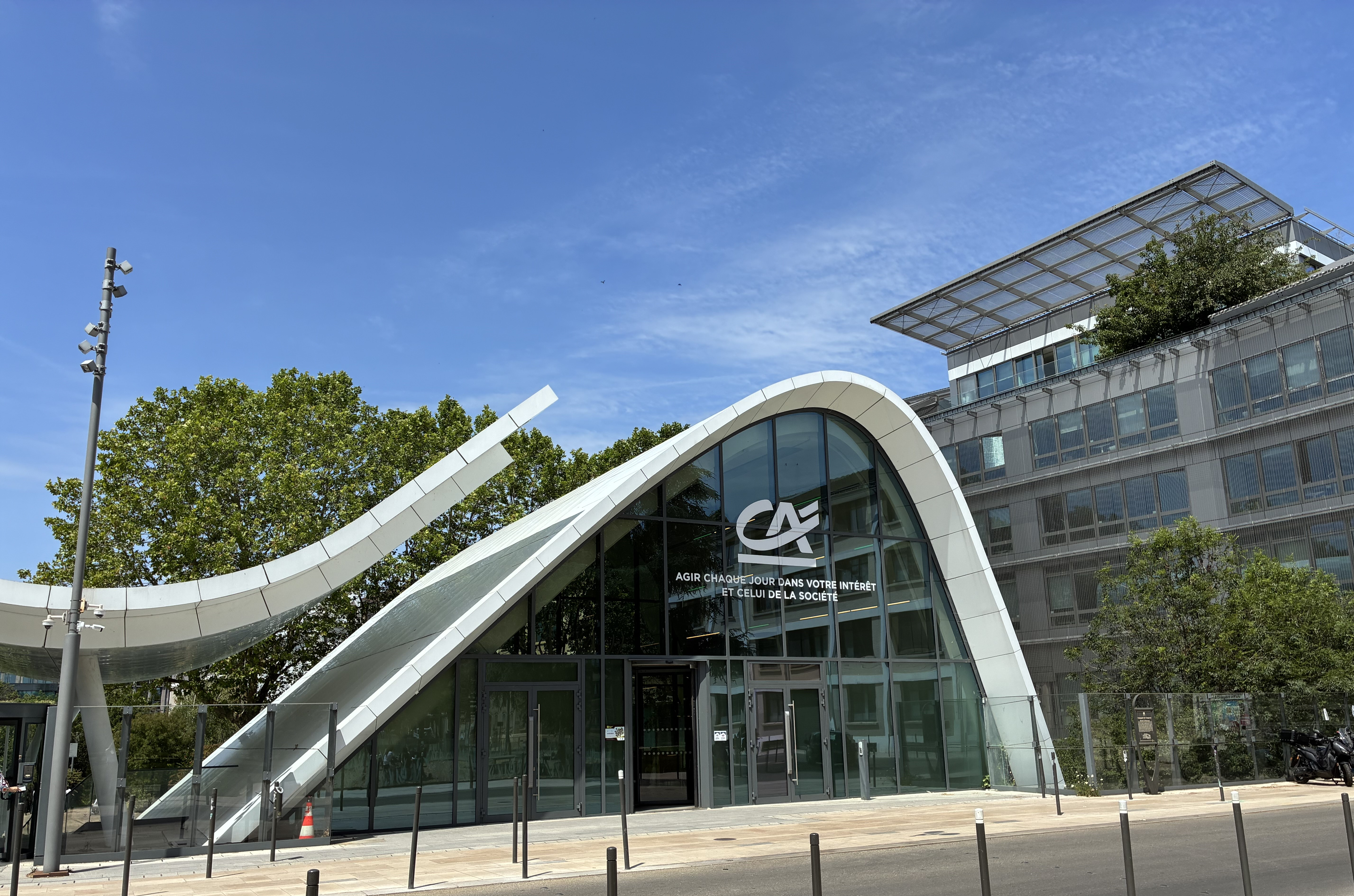
- Since 2010, Crédit Agricole has been headquartered in a remodeled former Schlumberger plant in Paris, known as Campus Evergreen
- Trade name: Crédit Agricole Group
- Type: Public
- Traded as: Euronext Paris: ACA; CAC 40 component
- Industry: Financial services
- Founded: 5 November 1894; 131 years ago
- Headquarters: Montrouge, France
- Area served: Worldwide
- Key people: Éric Vial (chairman); Olivier Gavalda (CEO)
- Products: Asset management; Banking; Commodities; Credit cards; Equities trading; Insurance; Investment management; Mortgage loans; Private equity; Wealth management
- Revenue: ▲€39.56 billion (2025)
- Operating income: ▲€16.09 billion (2025)
- Net income: ▲€8.75 billion (2025)
- Total assets: ▲€2.680 trillion (2025)
- Total equity: ▲€145.2 billion (2025)
- Number of employees: 154,000 (2025)
- Subsidiaries: LCL; Crédit Agricole CIB; Crédit Agricole Italia; Crédit Agricole Egypt; Amundi; BforBank
- Capital ratio: 17.3% CET1 (Group)
- Website: credit-agricole.com
- Footnotes; Crédit Agricole S.A.’s 2025 Universal Registration Document and Annual Financial Report

Crédit Agricole Group (French: [kʁedi aɡʁikɔl]), sometimes called La banque verte (pronounced [la bɑ̃k vɛʁt], lit. 'The green bank', due to its historical ties to farming), is a French international banking group and the world's largest cooperative financial institution.

In 2026, Crédit Agricole is the ninth-largest bank in the world in terms of assets, and the second-largest in France after BNP Paribas. It is also Europe's 3rd largest bank by assets, with $3.149 trillion in assets.

It consists of a network of Crédit Agricole local banks, 39 Crédit Agricole regional banks and a central institute, the Crédit Agricole S.A.. It is listed through Crédit Agricole S.A., as an intermediate holding company, on Euronext Paris' first market and is part of the CAC 40 stock market index. Local banks of the group owned the regional banks, in turn the regional banks majority owned the S.A. via a holding company, and in turn the S.A. owned part of the subsidiaries of the group, such as LCL, the Italian network and the CIB unit. It is considered to be a systemically important bank by the Financial Stability Board.

Since 1974, Crédit Agricole has been the sponsor of Coupe de France. It was also the title sponsor of the Crédit Agricole professional road cycling team from 1998 to 2008.

Crédit Agricole has been designated as a Significant Institution since the entry into force of European Banking Supervision in late 2014, and as a consequence is directly supervised by the European Central Bank.

== History ==
In the second half of the 19th century, French farmers struggled to obtain long-term, flexible, reasonably-priced credit. There were several attempts to set up farming banks, including Crédit Foncier de France in 1861, but none were successful.

=== Birth of Crédit Agricole and creation of the local and regional banks 1894–1900 ===
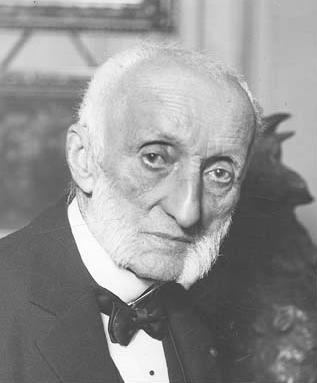
Jules Méline spearheaded the creation of the first local banks.

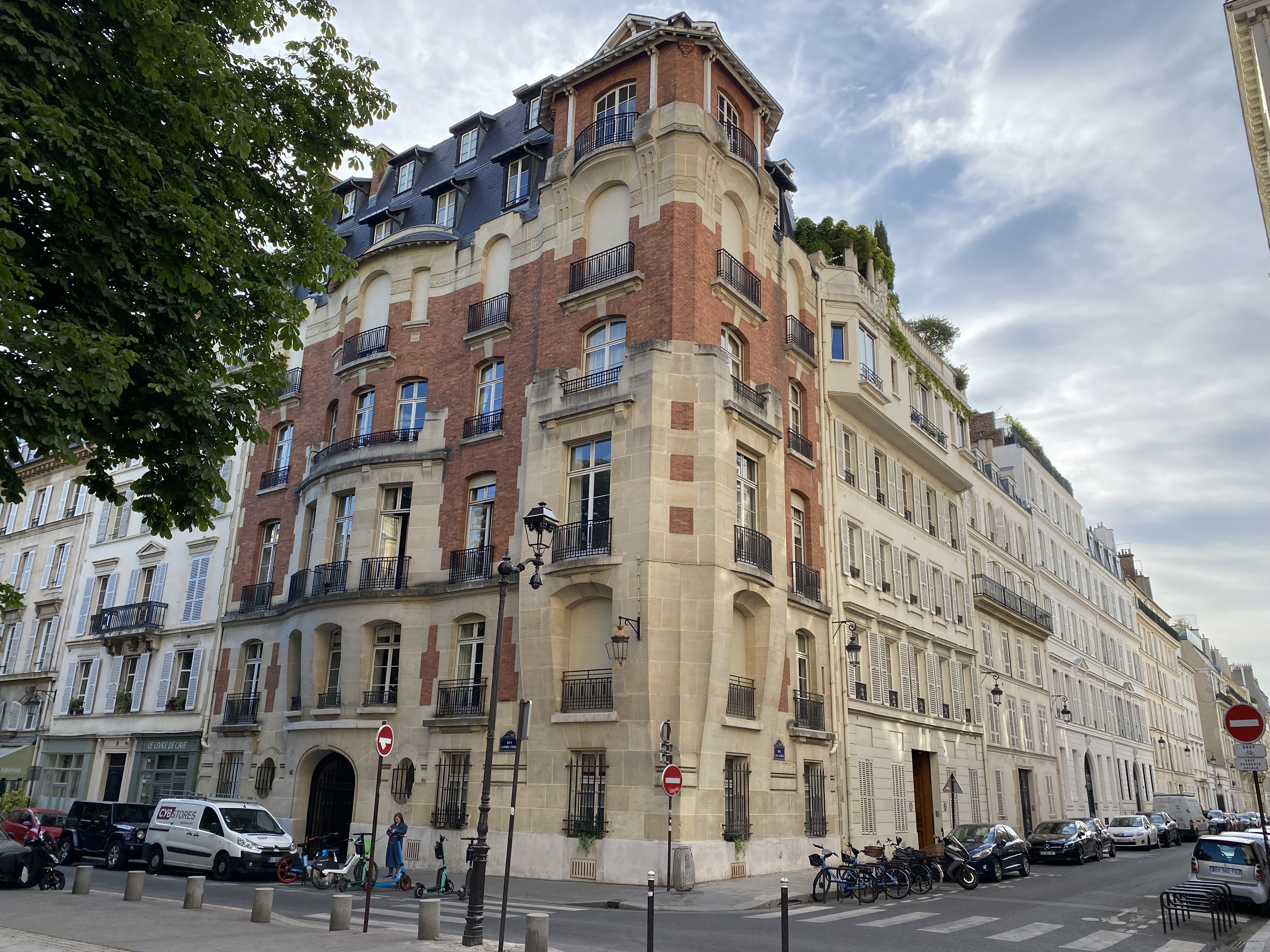
In 1921, the newly created National Office of Agricultural Credit (ONCA) moved from temporary offices to the corner building at the intersection of rue Las-Cases and rue Casimir-Périer, which can thus be viewed as the group's first permanent headquarters.

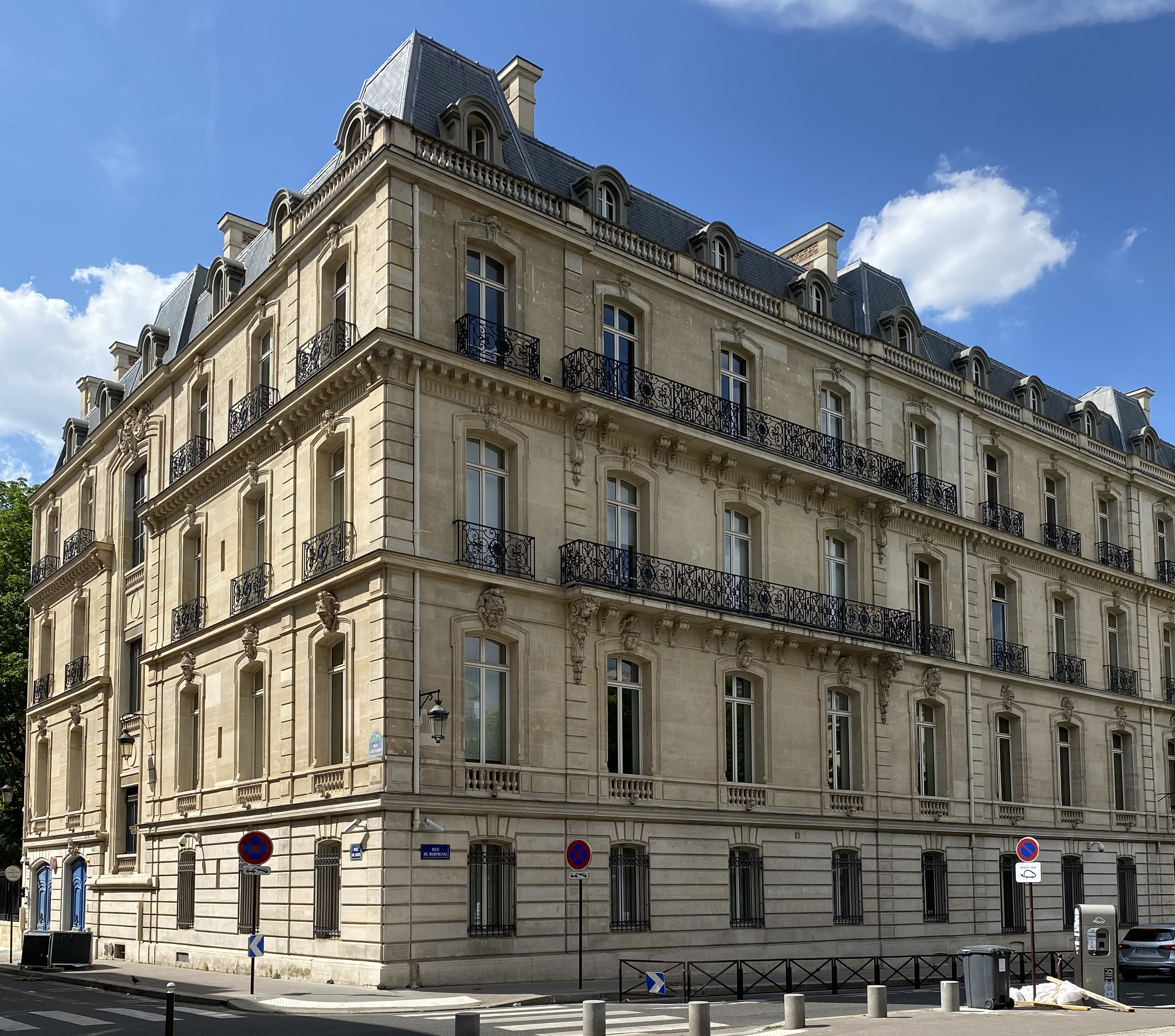
In the 1930s, the Caisse Nationale du Crédit Agricole moved across the square to a group of buildings with an entrance at 30, rue Las Cases, which remained its head office until the 1966 move to Montparnasse. It is now offices of the French National Assembly.

Crédit Agricole can trace its history back to the end of the 19th century, specifically to the Act of 1884 establishing the freedom of professional association, which authorised, among other things, the creation of syndicat agricoles (farm unions) and the foundation of local mutual banks. Société de Crédit Agricole was created on 23 February 1885 at Salins-les-Bains in the district of Poligny in the Jura region. It was the first of its kind in France.

Drawing on this experience to promote lending to small family farms, the Act of 5 November 1894, which had the support of the Minister for Agriculture Jules Méline, paved the way for the creation of Crédit Agricole's local banks. The first local banks were set up by local elites, including agronomists, teachers, and property owners, with farmers playing a minority role.

In the early years, business consisted exclusively of short-term loans provided as advances on harvests, enabling farmers to live more comfortably. Medium-term and long-term loans were added later, making it possible to buy equipment and livestock.

The 1894 Act did not confer any financial advantages, and the local banks soon faced financial problems, such as a lack of capital and insufficient collateral from small farmers. It was not until 1897 that the government addressed these problems by requiring the Banque de France to fund Crédit Agricole through an endowment of 40 million gold francs and an annual fee of 2 million francs. A year later, the Act of 1898 resolved the collateral issues. Meanwhile, the Act of 31 March 1899 instituted a commission within the Ministry for Agriculture to distribute the government advances between the regional banks, which were also created at this time. These cooperative entities brought together the local banks in their catchment area and acted as their clearing organisations.

=== Building nationwide coverage 1900–1945 ===
More and more local and regional banks were established from the turn of the century. Every region had at least one by the eve of the First World War. However, the government continued to provide three-quarters of the funding, and short-term lending still accounted for the lion's share of business despite the authorisation to issue long-term loans granted by the Acts of 29 December 1906 and 19 March 1910. With some regions becoming isolated owing to the War, the need for a central bank to regulate business became more apparent, especially as Crédit Agricole was asked to provide financing to rebuild farming operations damaged during the conflict.

New legislation of 5 August 1920 established a public central clearing organisation for the regional banks: the Office National de Crédit Agricole (ONCA), with Louis Tardy as its chief executive officer, merging two services that were previously embedded in the Ministry of Agriculture. In 1926, the institution was renamed Caisse Nationale de Crédit Agricole (CNCA).

In the 1920s, the bank continued to build its nationwide coverage and expand its business activities, notably by introducing loans to small-scale rural craftsmen in 1920, financing rural electrification, and financing local authorities in rural areas from 1923.

Local and regional banks did not emerge from the 1930 crisis unscathed. The Caisse Nationale took on a greater role and aided the most heavily exposed banks. A joint deposit guarantee fund was set up in 1935. The following year, Crédit Agricole provided additional support by financing wheat stocks through discounting when the National Cereals Board (ONIC) was established. The payment mechanisms used helped to make cheques and bank accounts more popular in the countryside.

Between 1939 and 1945, the Vichy regime imposed stricter state supervision on Crédit Agricole. Major financial developments also took place at this time, including the creation of the five-year note.

=== Post-War period and creation of Fédération Nationale du Crédit Agricole 1945–1966 ===
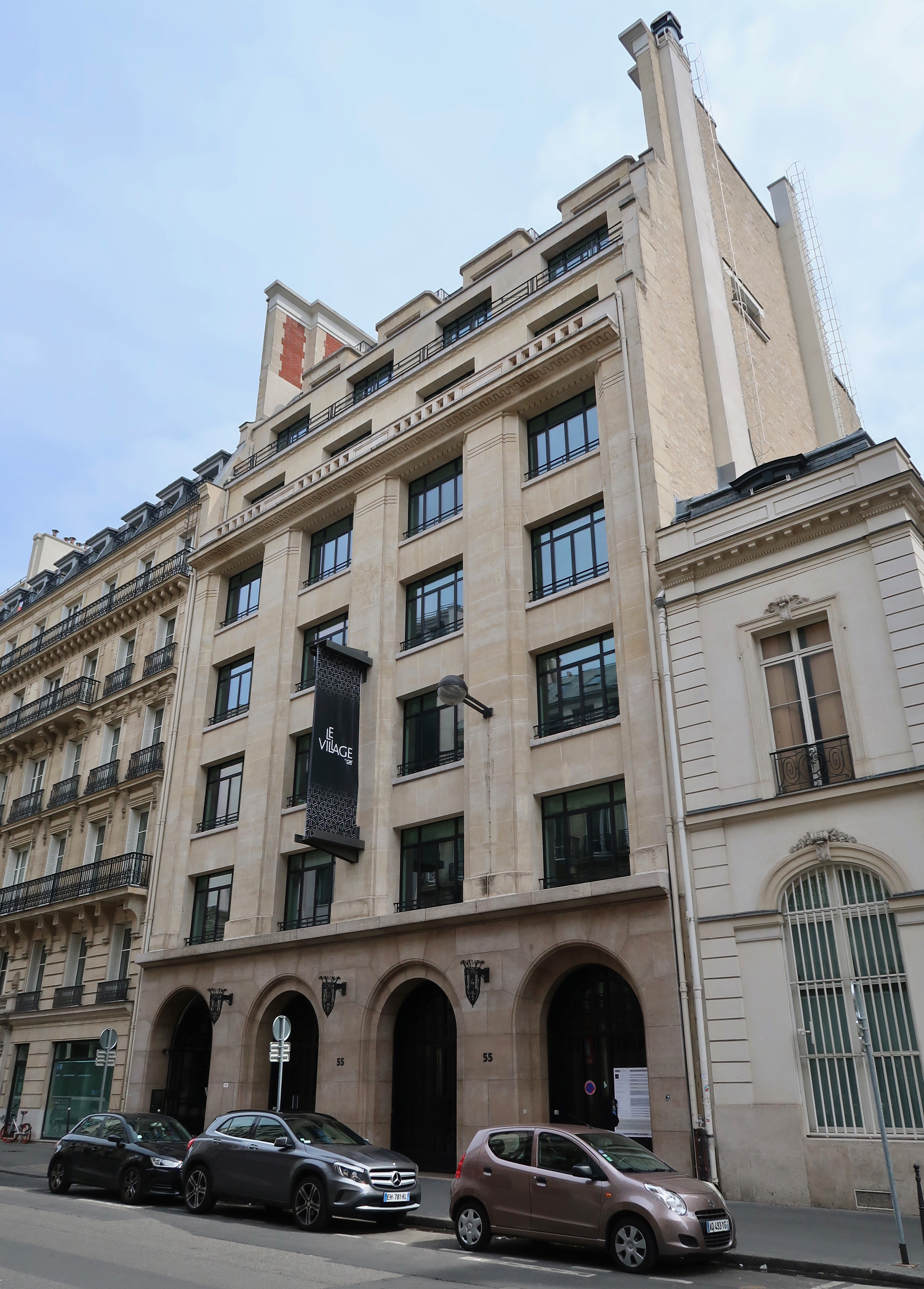
Building at 55, rue La Boétie in Paris, seat of the FNCA until 2001

To finance the post-war reconstruction and encourage the mechanisation of farming, CNCA stepped up deposit-taking to supplement the funds provided by the government. The regional banks opened many offices, with the total increasing from 1,000 in 1947 to 2,259 by 1967.

In 1959, Crédit Agricole was authorised by decree to finance property loans for primary residences in rural areas, irrespective of the status of the owner (even non-farmers).

Crédit Agricole continued to modernise, with an influx of new managerial talent both in the regional banks and at CNCA. In 1960, Paul Driant became the first Chairman of CNCA to come from a farming background. He remained in this position for 14 years.

=== Birth of a universal bank 1966–1988 ===
In 1966, as part of efforts to boost savings and remove Crédit Agricole from its budget, the government gave CNCA financial autonomy. Savings inflows no longer passed through the Treasury, and CNCA was now responsible for balancing the surpluses and deficits of the regional banks. The 1971 "Rurality Act" extended Crédit Agricole's potential financing sources to rural zones and to new types of customers, such as craftsmen and food producers. Lending to SMEs and mid-tier firms followed after.

The Banking Reform of 1966 allowed the organisation to offer households the same products as those provided by competitors, including passbook accounts and home savings plans.

The first subsidiaries were set up at the end of the 1960s to address the specific needs of CNCA: Union d'études et d'investissements (UI) was created in 1967 to make equity investments, followed by Segespar for asset management in 1968, and Unicrédit to grant loans to food producers in 1971. Crédit Agricole began distributing home purchase savings products from 1967, government-regulated mortgages from 1972 and first-time-buyer loans in 1977.

In 1976, the group adopted the slogan "le bon sens près de chez vous" ("common sense close to home").

Crédit Agricole opened its first foreign branch, in Chicago, in 1979.

The group's business diversification started in the 1980s. The Predica life insurance subsidiary was set up in 1986, while property & casualty unit Pacifica was created in 1990. The group expanded into bancassurance, offering the first retirement savings plans. At this time, many local bank directors were also directors of Groupama, an insurer from the farming sector. There was talk of a merger between the two, but this did not come to pass.

=== Institutional changes 1988–2001 ===
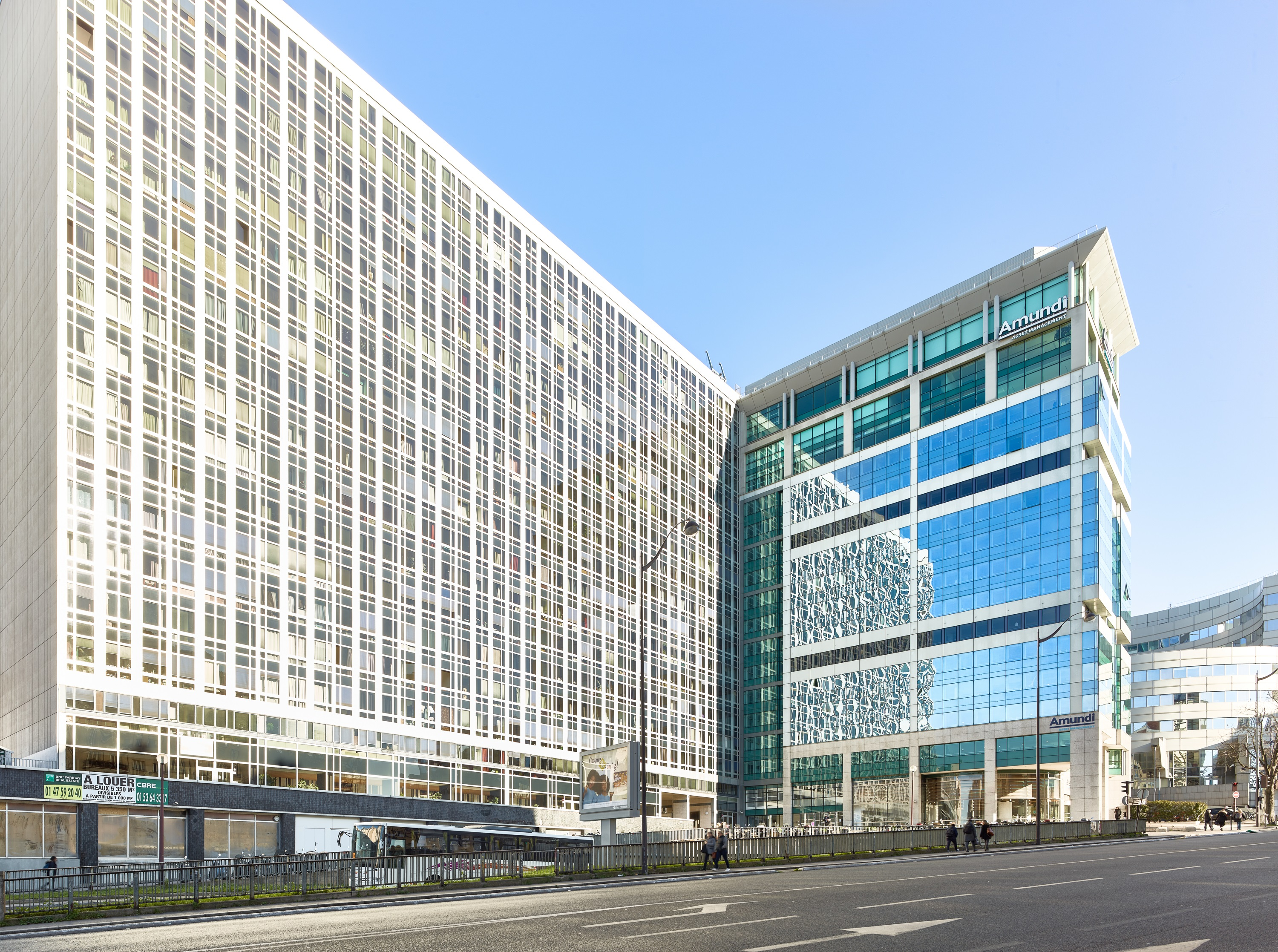
Building above the Gare Montparnasse on 91, boulevard Pasteur (right), after renovation in the late 1990s: former CNCA headquarters from 1966 to 2010, now head office of Amundi

On 18 January 1988, the CNCA Mutualisation Act came into force. CNCA was reincorporated into a public limited company, with a 90% stake sold to the regional banks and 10% to staff. Crédit Agricole became fully independent of the government, putting an end to the latter's practice of skimming off surplus funds. In 1990, Crédit Agricole lost the monopoly on granting low-interest loans to farmers and one year later, in 1991, the "normalisation" process was completed as it was allowed to begin financing large corporations.

International expansion continued with the acquisition of stakes in Banco Ambrosiano Veneto in Italy in 1989 and Banco Espírito Santo in Portugal in 1991.

Consolidation among the regional banks began officially in 1990, with the aim of reducing costs. The aim was to halve the number of regional banks, and that objective had been surpassed by the turn of the 21st century.

In 1993, Lucien Douroux, who led the plan to mutualise FNCA, became CNCA's first chief executive officer, having been appointed by Crédit Agricole from existing staff.

In 1996, the group bought Banque Indosuez and then created Indocam, an asset management subsidiary (renamed Crédit Agricole Asset Management in 1999), and Crédit Agricole Indosuez for corporate and investment banking. In 1999, diversification continued as the group took a stake in the newly privatised Crédit Lyonnais, and acquired leading consumer finance company Sofinco.

CNCA was listed on the stock market in 2001 under the name Crédit Agricole S.A. This gave the regional banks a listed vehicle through which to carry out major acquisitions.

== Crédit Agricole in the 21st century ==
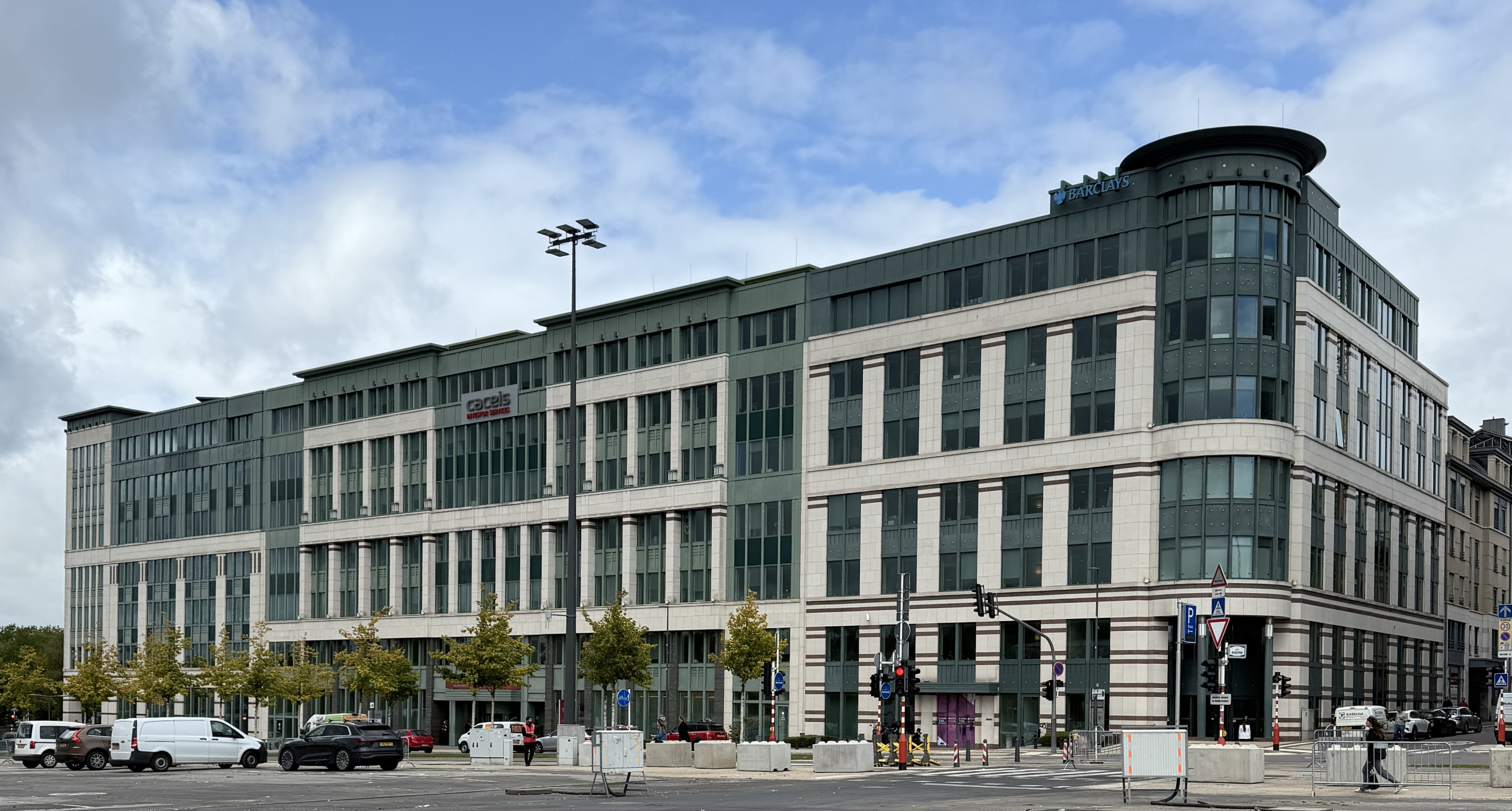
Building of Crédit Agricole's subsidiary Caceis in Luxembourg City

=== Business overview ===
The group's acquisitions enabled it to strengthen its leadership in French retail banking, expand its position in corporate and investment banking and build up its international network of branches and subsidiaries. By now, the group was the number-one bank in France with 28% of the domestic market, the global number-two by revenues and number-ten by profits, according to Fortune magazine, and number-15 worldwide according to Forbes rankings.

=== Crédit Agricole and the 2008–2012 crisis ===
Although less negatively impacted than some rivals by the 2008 financial crisis, when the interbank lending market seized up, Crédit Agricole was forced in January 2008 to sell its long-standing stake in Suez for €1.3 billion and then in May 2008 to organise a €5.9 billion rights issue to which all regional banks subscribed to meet Basel II regulatory requirements. It also undertook a €5 billion programme of non-strategic asset disposals.

At the end of 2008, the government decided to loan France's six largest banks €21 billion in two tranches, at an interest rate of 8%, to enable them to continue to play their role in the economy. Crédit Agricole did not take part in the second tranche and repaid the government in October 2009. Crédit Agricole's crisis exit strategy was well received by the markets, with the share price gaining more than 40% over 2009.

In 2012, Crédit Agricole continued to report negative results, posting a loss of around €3 billion in the third quarter. The Greek branch Emporiki was separated from its profitable wealthy parts in Albania, Bulgaria and Romania which were integrated into the Crédit Agricole group. The whole investment into Emporiki cost around €9 billion. The remaining Greek part was sold off to Alpha Bank for €1. Crédit Agricole also withdrew totally from Spanish bank Bankinter, resulting in a book loss of €193 million, and took a massive €600 million write-down on consumer credit, notably owing to difficulties in Italy. Furthermore, Crédit Agricole had to write down the goodwill on its balance sheet. Goodwill amounted to €17.7 billion in September 2012, well above the actual value. In early February 2013, the bank announced that it would book €3.8 billion in writedowns and costs – a record amount according to the media.

=== Mergers and acquisitions from 2014 ===
In March 2014, the Crédit Agricole Group unveiled its medium-term strategic plan, which put the emphasis on retail banking, insurance and saving. Internationally, the group decided to refocus on its core markets, starting with Italy, the group's second-largest market.

The Crédit Agricole Group sold its Bulgarian subsidiary to Corporate Commercial Bank for €160 million. On 22 April 2014, Crédit Agricole S.A., Crédit Agricole Nord and Crédit Agricole Nord-Est announced that they would sell 50% of their stake in Crelan S.A., a Belgian bank created out of the merger of Crédit Agricole Belgique and Centea, to Caisses coopératives belges by June 2015.

In 2017, the group bought three small Italian independent saving banks (Banca Carim, Cassa di Risparmio di Cesena and Cassa di Risparmio di San Miniato), in addition to Banca Leonardo through Indosuez Wealth Management.

The effects of the third industrial revolution on the digital management of banks are considered. On 28 January 2020, Crédit Agricole announced an 85% stake acquisition in the fintech Linxo for its budget management app.

In 2021, the Crédit Agricole group entered the neobank market by launching Blank, a mobile app tailored for self-employed workers, offering them a professional account and an ecosystem of management tools. The group continued expanding in the sector in 2022, announcing the launch of two new professional accounts: Propulse by CA and LCL Essentiel Pro through its subsidiary LCL. Both offerings were developed in partnership with Blank via the startup studio La Fabrique by CA.

During the coronavirus crisis, the group was one of the leading contributors to the implementation of the state-guaranteed loan (PGE) program, accounting for over a quarter of PGEs in France. In February 2022, Generali announced the acquisition of La Médicale, Crédit Agricole's medical insurance subsidiary, for €435 million.

On 7 April 2022, Crédit Agricole announced the acquisition of a 9.18% stake in Banco BPM, Italy's third-largest bank. In August 2023, Crédit Agricole announced its intent to purchase a majority stake in Belgian private bank Degroof Petercam via its subsidiary Indosuez Wealth Management, the acquisition was finalised in 2024 with Crédit Agricole owning a 65% stake in Degroof Petercam.

In July 2023, CACEIS, previously jointly owned by Crédit Agricole and Banco Santander at that time, purchased RBC Investor Services' activities in Europe. The acquisition expanded CACEIS's geographic footprint in Europe and included an operations centre in Malaysia with over 1,200 staff. Following the acquisition, CACEIS provided custody for approximately €5 trillion in client assets.

For the entirety of 2023, the group reported over €8 billion in net profit for the third consecutive year. Its insurance division alone grew by 12.6% compared to the previous year, achieving a net result of €1.65 billion.

In January 2024, Crédit Agricole acquired a 7% stake in Worldline. In December 2024, Crédit Agricole increased through derivatives its stake in Banco BPM up to 19.8%, the increase was authorized by the ECB in April 2025.

In December 2024, Crédit Agricole agreed to buy Banco Santander's 30.5% stake in custody and asset servicing entity CACEIS, giving the French lender full control of the business. The transaction, expected to complete in 2025, excludes CACEIS's Latin American joint venture, which remains jointly controlled. Credit Agricole had previously expanded its asset servicing business with the acquisition of RBC Investor Services' operations in 2023.

In April 2025, Crédit Agricole (through its subsidiary Indosuez Wealth Management) signed an agreement to purchase Swiss private bank Banque Thaler. The acquisition was finalised in September 2025 and Banque Thaler was incorporated into Indosuez Wealth Management in December 2025, through a merger by absorption. In May 2025, Crédit Agricole announced the acquisition of a 9.9% minority stake in Crelan. In July 2025, Credit Agricole announced that it would seek the ECB's approval to increase its stake in Banco BPM beyond the threshold of 20%.

In January 2026, Crédit Agricole launched Indosuez Corporate Advisory, a corporate finance advisory firm focused on providing advisory services to French SMEs and mid-sized companies, including mergers and acquisitions. In July 2026, Crédit Agricole increased its stake in Banco BPM to 29.3%, just below the 29.9% threshold that would require Crédit Agricole to launch a full bid on the Italian lender.

In October 2026, Crédit Agricole significantly expanded its footprint in Germany: on the one hand, Crédit Agricole launched a digital retail bank in Germany ('Crédit Agricole Deutschland'), on the other it announced the acquisition of German lender IKB Deutsche Industriebank from Lone Star Funds.

== Corporate governance ==
Crédit Agricole has a three-tier structure, comprising the local banks, the regional banks (and their branches and equity investments) and Crédit Agricole S.A. (and its subsidiaries). The local and regional banks are cooperative companies. Crédit Agricole S.A. is a société anonyme. Crédit Agricole is one of the leading cooperative companies in the world.

Promoting employment for people with disabilities

Through an association set up to promote the employment of people with disabilities within Crédit Agricole (HECA), the Crédit Agricole regional banks devote resources to the recruitment, integration and continued employment of disabled workers. Measures include workstation modifications, transport facilities and training. Since a lack of training makes it harder for people with disabilities to get work, Crédit Agricole has set up work/study training programmes to enable people who have their high school diploma to receive post-secondary qualifications. The goal was to recruit more than 800 disabled persons between 2006 and end-2010, and by end-2009, more than 360 permanent contracts and 670 work/study contracts had been signed. Former Miss France runner-up Sophie Vouzelaud, who has been deaf from birth, is HECA's official ambassador.

Promoting the cooperative model

The regional banks help to promote the cooperative model locally through a variety of initiatives, such as the Perspectives Mutualistes conference series (Pau in 2006, Angers in 2007, Reims in 2008, Orléans in 2009), and by issuing special bank cards for stakeholders.

Board of directors

The Board is made up of members elected by the annual general meeting, representatives of trade organisations, members elected by employees, a non-voting member and a representative of the Works Council.

A complex structure

The regional banks own 54% of Crédit Agricole S.A., which in turn holds 25% of their capital in the form of non-voting cooperative securities (certificats coopératifs d'associés). An internal debate is continually underway on striking a balance between growing activities that serve the regional banks directly and promoting businesses that lie outside their sphere. Institutional investors, particularly in the UK and US, are not always at ease with this approach.

== International operations ==
In addition to its strong presence in France, Crédit Agricole has subsidiaries in several countries in the world:

- Degroof Petercam (Belgium)
- Crédit Agricole Egypt (Egypt)
- Crédit Agricole Italia (Italy)
- de:Creditplus Bank (Germany)

Crédit Agricole also owns minority stakes in several banks:

- Banco BPM (Italy) 29.3%
- Crelan (Belgium) 9.99%

=== Italy ===
Crédit Agricole established its presence in Italy in 1961 with the opening of a Crédit Lyonnais representative office in Rome, followed by the expansion of Banque Indosuez during the 1970s. In 1993, Crédit Agricole became the largest shareholder of Banco Ambrosiano Veneto and developed close ties with Cassa di Risparmio delle Province Lombarde. The two institutions merged in 1997 to form Banca Intesa, of which Crédit Agricole became the leading shareholder. This alliance ended in 2006 when Banca Intesa merged with Sanpaolo IMI to create Intesa Sanpaolo. Crédit Agricole subsequently established its own banking network in Italy by acquiring several regional banks, including Cariparma and FriulAdria in 2007, followed in 2017 by Cassa di Risparmio di Cesena, Cassa di Risparmio di Rimini, and Cassa di Risparmio di San Miniato. In 2019, these entities were consolidated under the brand Crédit Agricole Italia, which later acquired Credito Valtellinese in 2021.

=== Poland ===
Crédit Agricole entered the Polish market in 2001 by acquiring a majority stake in Lukas Bank and taking over Europejski Fundusz Leasingowy. In September 2011, Lukas Bank was renamed Crédit Agricole Bank Polska.

=== Switzerland ===
In 1876, Crédit Lyonnais opened its first branch in Geneva. This establishment marked the origin of Crédit Agricole's Swiss presence following the acquisition of Crédit Lyonnais in 2003. The Swiss retail banking subsidiary changed its name in 2017 to Crédit Agricole next bank.

=== Ukraine ===
In 1993, Crédit Lyonnais opened a subsidiary in Kyiv, becoming one of the first foreign-owned banks to operate in the country following the declaration of independence of Ukraine. This entity joined Crédit Agricole following its takeover of Crédit Lyonnais in 2003. The group expanded in 2006 by acquiring Index Bank, which was renamed Crédit Agricole Ukraine in March 2011. Following the Russian invasion of Ukraine, the subsidiary maintained its banking operations in the country. In March 2026, Crédit Agricole signed an agreement to acquire Bank Lviv.

== Brand identity ==
=== Slogan ===
- 1976 to 1987: "Le bon sens près de chez vous" ("Common sense close to home");
- 1987 to 1994: "Le bon sens en action" ("Common sense in action");
- 1994 to 2005: "L'imagination dans le bon sens" ("Imagination guided by common sense" but also "Imagination in the right direction");
- 2005 to 2011: "Une relation durable, ça change la vie" ("A lasting relationship changes your life");
- 2011 to 2016: "Le bon sens a de l'avenir" ("Common sense has a future");
- 2016 to 2020: "Toute une banque pour vous" ("A whole bank for you");
- Since 2020: “Agir chaque jour dans votre intérêt et celui de la société” ("Working every day in the interest of our customers and society").

=== Visual identity ===
1971: third logo, combining the letters C and A.

1987: creation of the current logo, which summarises the group's desire to continue to move forward and to favour openness towards the outside world.

== Financial and market data ==
The cooperative investment certificates of 15 regional banks, and the shares of Crédit Agricole S.A., the group holding company, are listed on the Paris stock exchange. Crédit Agricole S.A. is also a member of the Dow Jones, Euro Stoxx 50, SBF 120, Euronext 100, ASPI Eurozone and FTSE4Good Index.

== Controversies ==
- In September 2007 Credit Agricole had to book a €250 million charge related to an unauthorized trading loss at its New York subsidiary.
- On 18 April 2008, Credit Agricole revealed that it would post $1.2 billion in losses related to subprime mortgage securities. In May 2008 Credit Agricole sought to raise €5.9 billion in equity capital from its shareholders. The shares controversially sold off from €19 to €6 over the successive period as the 2008 financial crisis escalated.
- In May 2008 Credit Agricole identified €5 billion of asset disposals including the bank's 5.6 percent stake in Italian bank Intesa Sanpaolo, which was worth an estimated €3 billion.
- The group purchased in August 2006 Emporiki Bank for €2.2 billion which it later sold for one euro after suffering €6 billion of losses in the investment.
- In 2010 the French government's Autorité de la concurrence (the department in charge of regulating competition) fined eleven banks, including Crédit Agricole, the sum of €384.9 million for colluding to charge unjustified fees on check processing, especially for extra fees charged during the transition from paper check transfer to "Exchanges Check-Image" electronic transfer.
- In 2022, subsidiaries of Crédit Agricole that operate from Switzerland and Monaco agreed to pay over $1 million to the United States for violating sanctions against a number of countries, including Sudan, Syria, Cuba, and the Crimea region of Ukraine.

== See also ==
- List of banks in France
- List of banks in the euro area
- List of European cooperative banks
