= Cassa di Risparmio di Carrara =

C.R. Carrara
- Native name: Cassa di Risparmio di Carrara S.p.A.
- Type: subsidiary of a listed company
- Industry: Financial services
- Founded: 1843; 1992 (S.p.A.)
- Defunct: 2015
- Fate: absorbed by the parent company
- Successor: Fondazione CR Carrara (charity); branches of Banca Carige (banking)
- Headquarters: Carrara, Italy
- Services: Retail and corporate banking
- Total assets: €1,225,203,326 (mid-2015)
- Total equity: €97,102,869 (mid-2015)
- Owner: Banca Carige (90%); Fondazione CR Carrara (10%)
- Parent: Fondazione CR Carrara (1992–95); Carinord (1995–2004); Banca Carige (2004–15)
- Footnotes in separate financial statements

Cassa di Risparmio di Carrara S.p.A. was an Italian saving bank based in Carrara, Tuscany. The bank was absorbed by the parent company Banca Carige in 2015.

== History ==
Cassa di Risparmio di Carrara was found in 1843 in Carrara in the Duchy of Modena and Reggio. In 1992 the statutory corporation was split into a limited company (Italian: società per azioni) and Fondazione Cassa di Risparmio di Carrara (a banking foundation). At that time the banking foundation owned 66.67% stake of the company, with the rest was owned by Cassa di Risparmio delle Provincie Lombarde (Cariplo). In 1995, a sub-holding company "Carinord Holding" was formed, which Cariplo was the significant shareholder for 30.93% stake, in turn the holding owned 90% stake of CR Carrara. The holding also owned the saving bank in Alessandria (50% + 1 share) and Spezia (68.19%). In 1998 Cariplo became part of Banca Intesa. In 2002 Carinord was split into Carinord 1 and Carinord 2; CR Alessandria was owned by Carinord 1 S.p.A. and Carispezia and CAR Carrara were owned by Carinord 2. As at 31 December 2002, Banca Intesa owned 41.14% stake in Carinord 2 S.p.A., with the banking foundations of Carispezia and CR Carrara remained as the minority shareholders of the sub-holding.

In 2003 CR Carrara and Carispezia were acquired by Banca Carige and Banca CR Firenze respectively. Carige acquired about 43.49% stake in Carinord 2 from Intesa (16.46% for €46 million) and the banking foundation of CR Carrara (27.03%) for €183,764,644 in total (with 5,192,231 shares or 2.44% stake of Carinord 2 was re-sold to Banca CR Firenze for €10,301,778 in the eve of demerger). In April 2004 Carinord 2 was demerged and Caricarrara Holding S.p.A. was created, making the 90% stake of the saving bank cost Carige about €173 million.

As at 31 December 2014, the banking foundation still owned 10% of the saving bank, as well as 0.679% stake in Banca Carige.

In 2015 Banca Carige absorbed CR Carrara and sister companies Cassa di Risparmio di Savona and Columbus Carige Immobiliare. Carige purchased the remaining 10% stake by issuing new shares of Carige.

== Foundation ==
After spin off the banking activities, the original entity of the bank became Fondazione Cassa di Risparmio di Carrara. As at 31 December 2015, the foundation had a net assets of €109 million. It is a minority shareholder of Banca Carige and Cassa Depositi e Prestiti for 1.17% and 0.019% respectively.

The foundation also signed a shareholders' agreement with Fondazione Cassa di Risparmio di Savona, Coop Liguria and Talea Società di Gestione Immobiliare for a total of 4.17% shares.

== See also ==
- List of banks in Italy
