= UniCredit banka =

UniCredit banka may refer to:

- UniCredit Bank Serbia (Serbian: UniCredit Bank Srbija), a Serbian subsidiary of Italian banking group UniCredit, sometimes known as UniCredit banka
- UniCredit Bank Slovenia (Slovene: UniCredit Banka Slovenija), a subsidiary of Italy-based UniCredit Group

== See also ==
- UniCredit Banca, a defunct retail banking division of UniCredit Group
