= Rolo Banca =

Italian bank

Rolo Banca 1473
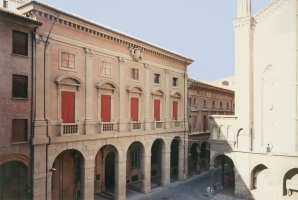
- Palazzo Magnani, Bologna, seat of Rolo Banca
- Native name: Rolo Banca 1473 S.p.A.
- Company type: subsidiary
- Industry: Financial services
- Predecessor: Carimonte Banca; Credito Romagnolo Holding; Credito Romagnolo
- Founded: 1 January 1996
- Defunct: 30 June 2002
- Fate: absorbed into UniCredit
- Successor: UniCredit Banca
- Headquarters: Palazzo Magnani, 20 via Zamboni, Bologna, Italy
- Owner: Credit Carimonte (42.34%); UniCredit (18.83%); Fondazione Carimodena (3.73%); Fondazione Monte Bologna e Ravenna (0.01%)
- Parent: UniCredit
- Subsidiaries: Cassa di Risparmio di Carpi; Banca dell'Umbria; Banca Agricola Commerciale (San Marino)
- Website: www.rolobanca.it

Rolo Banca 1473 S.p.A. was an Italian bank based in Bologna, Italy. It was formed by the merger of Credito Italiano subsidiaries Credito Romagnolo, and Carimonte Banca. The intermediate holding company of the bank was Credit Carimonte, a 51–49 joint venture of Credito Italiano (after 1998 UniCredit) and Carimonte Holding (itself another joint venture of Fondazione Carimodena and Fondazione del Monte di Bologna e Ravenna in 50–50 voting rights and 60–40 share capitals).

== History ==
The predecessor of the bank could be traced back to Mount of Piety of Bologna, found 1473, which was merged with Mount of Piety of Ravenna (found 1492) to form Banca del Monte di Bologna e Ravenna in 1966. In 1991 Carimonte Banca was formed by the merger of the Banca Monte and Cassa di Risparmio di Modena (found 1846). On 1 January 1996 Carimonte was merged with Credito Romagnolo (found 1896), a Credito Italiano subsidiary. Credito Romagnolo Holding, a sub-holding company, was renamed to Rolo Banca 1473 S.p.A..

In 1998 Rolo Banca became part of UniCredito Italiano (UniCredit), after the ultimate parent company was merged with Unicredito. Rolo Banca also absorbed Banca Popolare del Molise, Carimonte Fondiario and Rolosim into the company in the same year.

in 1999 Rolo Banca acquired a majority interests in Banca dell'Umbria.

In 2000 Rolo Banca acquired 73.81% shares of Cassa di Risparmio di Carpi.

As at 31 December 2001, Rolo Banca had a shareholders equity of €3.173 billion in a consolidated balance sheet.

On 30 June 2002, Rolo Banca, Banca CRT, Cariverona Banca, Cassamarca, Cassa di Risparmio di Trento e Rovereto, Cassa di Risparmio di Trieste and Credit Carimonte were absorbed into UniCredit Banca.

== See also ==
- Casse Emiliano Romagnole
- Cassa di Risparmio in Bologna
- List of banks in Italy
