= Banca Popolare del Molise =

Banca Popolare del Molise was an Italian bank based in Campobasso, Molise.

The bank was one of the "big three" banks in the Molise region in 1994 (in terms of deposit and lending market), as well as ranked the 181st by client deposits in the whole Italy.

The bank was absorbed by Rolo Banca, a subsidiary of Credito Italiano in June 1998.

The successor of the parent company of the bank (Credito Italiano), and its main competitor (Banca di Roma): UniCredit (Credito Italiano) and Capitalia (Banca di Roma) respectively was merged in 2007. UniCredit Banca di Roma, had 38 branches in the Molise region in 2008, which included 19 via Pietrunto, the former headquarter of BPM. However, the site was assigned to UniCredit Banca from 2002 to 2007.

== History ==
The bank had a market shares (in lending market, year missing, short term) of 19.5% in Molise region, comparing to competitors Banca di Roma (30.99%) and Banco di Napoli (14.95%) respectively, according to reports from Autorità Garante della Concorrenza e del Mercato. According to another source (Banca d'Italia), BP Molise had market shares (short to long term lending) of 11.84%, compared to Banca di Roma Group (19.60%), Banco di Napoli Group (15.93%) and Banca Nazionale del Lavoro Group (9.48%) in 1994. While in deposit market, BP Molise had a market shares of 23.60%, behind Banca di Roma Group (34.94%), but ahead Banco di Napoli (9.58%) and Credito Molisano (7.79%).

In 1994 35% stake of the bank was acquired by Credito Romagnolo. Credito Romagnolo was acquired by Credito Italiano in 1995; Credito Romagnolo was merged with Carimonte Banca on 31 December 1995, forming Rolo Banca.

In 1994 the bank had 17 branches (including headquarter); 16 in Molise and 1 in Abruzzo.

== See also ==
- Credito Molisano
- List of banks in Italy
