= Cassa di Risparmio della Marca Trivigiana =

Italian savings bank

Cassamarca
- bank logo on a golden anniversary (1913–1963) coin of the bank
- Formerly: Cassa di Risparmio di Treviso; Cassa di Risparmio della Marca Trivigiana
- Company type: Statutory corporation (until 1992); Subsidiary (since 1992); Società per azioni (since 1992)
- Industry: Financial services
- Predecessor: Monte di Pietà di Treviso
- Founded: 1496 (predecessor); 1822; 1907 (refound); 1913 (split from Monte); 1942 (merged with Monte); 1992 (as S.p.A.)
- Founder: Monte di Pietà di Treviso
- Defunct: 1872 (merged with Cariplo); 2002
- Fate: merged to form single brand UniCredit
- Successor: UniCredit Banca; other UniCredit divisions; Fondazione Cassamarca
- Headquarters: Treviso, Italy
Number of locations
▲119	(2000)
▲123	(2001)
Key people
Dino De Poli	(chairman, until 2000)
Antonio Romano	(chairman, 2000–2002)
Pietro Pignata	(chairman, 2002)
- Services: retail banking; corporate banking
Net income
▲€52 million	(2000)
▲€57 million	(2001)
Total equity
▲€252 million	(2000)
▲€279 million	(2001)
- Owner: UniCredit (100%)
Number of employees
▲1,137	(2000)
▼1,130	(2001)
- Parent: UniCredit
- Website: www.cassamarca.it
- Footnotes / references source: 2000 financial figures was originally in Italian lira, but at that time already pegged with euro

Cassa di Risparmio della Marca Trivigiana, also known as Cassamarca in short, was an Italian savings bank headquartered in Treviso, Veneto. The history of the bank goes back to 1496 when the charitable institution Monte di Pietà di Treviso was founded. The savings bank was established by the Monte in 1907, following a first bank spinoff in 1822 that ended up being absorbed in 1872 by the Cassa di Risparmio delle Provincie Lombarde.

In 1992, following the Legge Amato, the bank was split into two organizations: a commercial bank, Cassamarca S.p.A., and the non-profit Fondazione Cassamarca – Cassa di Risparmio della Marca Trivigiana. In 1994, Cassamarca merged with the larger Cassa di Risparmio di Verona, Vicenza, Belluno e Ancona to form Unicredito, which in turn merged in 1998 with Credito Italiano to form UniCredit. The banking entity was fully absorbed into UniCredit in 2002; the foundation survived as a charitable organization (as of 2017), and still owned a 0.23 percent stake in UniCredit as of 31 December 2016.

== Predecessors ==
The mount logo. Approved by a royal decree in 1929

=== Monte di Pietà di Treviso ===
Monte di Pietà di Treviso was a mount of piety (Italian: monte di pietà) founded in 1496, by Franciscan Domenico da Ponzone in the Republic of Venice, 34 years after the first recorded mount of Italy was founded in Perugia, by other Franciscans, Bernardine of Feltre and Michele Carcano, in the Papal States. In 1822 the mount founded the savings bank of Treviso and again in 1907. After twice spin off, the mount was merged back to the savings bank in 1942. The mount was also known as Monte di Credito su Pegno di Treviso since 1935.

The building of the mount contained several decoration and wall painting by various artists, such as Lodewijk Toeput (Italian: Ludovico Pozzoserrato).

=== Cassa di Risparmio di Treviso ===
The first savings bank (Italian: cassa di risparmio) of the city was founded by the local mount of piety in 1822, (Note: A scan of the original avviso was available in Sartor-Foundation's book as picture 36 in color page 27.) at that time still part of the Kingdom of Lombardy–Venetia of the Austrian Empire. Similar savings bank was also founded in other cities of modern Veneto region (as well as in Lombardy) by the Austrian government, such as Venice, Verona, Vicenza, Rovigo and Padua in the 1820s. The savings bank of Vienna, in the capital of the Empire, was founded in 1819.

After the unification of Italy, in 1866, the savings bank gained its independent status, (Note: Stated as regio decreto N.4714 of 9 December 1866, but original text and gazetted date were not stated in Sartor-Foundation's book) but affiliated to Cassa di Risparmio delle Provincie Lombarde (Cariplo; known as Cassa di Risparmio di Lombardia at that time) in 1868. The assets and liabilities were transferred to Treviso branch in 1872, as a fulfillment of the decree-law in 1868. (Note: A scan of the original avviso was available in Sartor-Foundation's book as picture 46 in color page 29.)

== History ==
=== Cassa di Risparmio della Marca Trivigiana ===
The savings bank of Treviso was re-established by the mount in 1907 as Banco dei Depositi a Risparmio del Monte di Pietà di Treviso; (Note: Sartor-Foundation's book had extended chapter and some scan of the original document for this period, which differ from the bank own narrative.) it was separated from the mount in 1913 as Cassa di Risparmio della Marca Trivigiana. Marca Trivigiana was the ancient name of the area around Treviso.

In 1928, due to the royal decree-law No.269 of 1927, (law no.2587 of 1927) the savings bank acquired fellow savings bank Cassa di Risparmio di Castelfranco Veneto, as the law promoted merger of savings banks that under a threshold of size. In 1938 Banca Popolare di Asolo (Note: Not to be confused with Banca Popolare del Mandamento di Asolo (incorporated in 1946), one of the predecessors of Veneto Banca, formerly known as Banca Popolare di Asolo e Montebelluna (founded in 1966 by merger).) was also acquired. The local mount of piety of Treviso was also merged with the savings bank in 1942 (during the World War II), along with counterpart in the comuni of Asolo in 1941, Castelfranco Veneto in 1942 and Vittorio Veneto in 1949 after the war.

A report by Mediobanca, shown the bank was ranked 74th by total assets in 1988, among all type of commercial banks.

=== Cassamarca S.p.A. ===
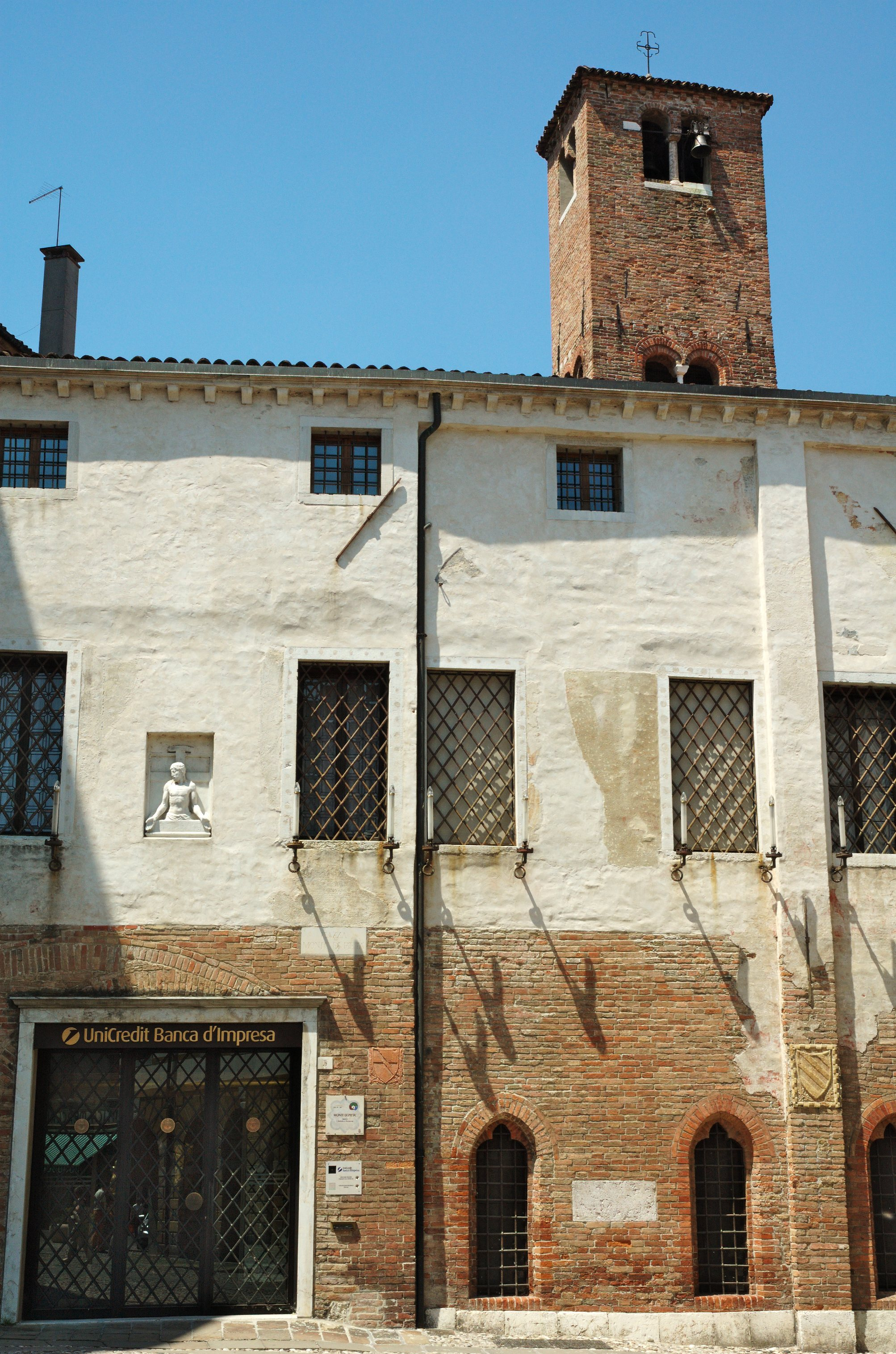
A UniCredit Banca d'Impresa branch, located in a shop unit of the complex of the former mount, 2005

Due to Legge Amato, in 1992, the bank was split into two organizations, a società per azioni and a banking foundation. At first the bank (Cassamarca S.p.A.) had a share capital of 270 billion lire, excluding share premium.

The law also started a merger and acquisition of the banking sector of Italy, especially the eventual birth of several banking group, especially in Veneto region as UniCredit, Banca Intesa, Sanpaolo IMI, Banco Popolare di Verona e Novara, Banca Antonveneta, Banca Popolare di Vicenza and Veneto Banca. However, the consolidation also saw the retirement of the brand Cassamarca as a bank.

A further amendment of laws in 1994, making directors of the foundation, cannot be a member the board of the bank that the foundation controlled; Dino De Poli, chairman of Cassamarca at that time, was temporarily allowed to remain in both of the boards, as the law also allowed banks that were merging with other banks, to do so. In the same year, Cassamarca formed a new banking group Unicredito with fellow Veneto savings bank Cariverona Banca S.p.A.; Fondazione Cariverona was the largest shareholder of the new banking group. The proposed merger was announced in 1993. In 1995, Cariverona formed an alliance with Cassa di Risparmio di Torino (Banca CRT), both banks were the leading savings bank of Italy according to Mediobanca's report in 1989. Their competitors Cariplo, was located in Lombardy region. Uncredito's competitors: the rest of the savings bank of Veneto merged to form Casse Venete Banca in 1994.

According to the Bank of Italy figures, in term of market share in deposit (Italian: quote di mercato dei depositi), before the merger of Cariverona (Cassa di Risparmio di Verona, Vicenza, Belluno e Ancona), and Cassamarca, they also had a significant market share in their home province(s). For Cassamarca, it was 24.59% in the Province of Treviso in 1994.

A minority stake of Slovak bank Pol'nobanka and Bosnian Croats bank Hrvatska Banka Mostar, were acquired by Cassamarca in 1995 and 1997, according to the company.

In 1997 Banca CRT formally joined Unicredito and in the next year Unicredito merged with Credito Italiano to form UniCredito Italiano (now known as UniCredit). De Poli remained as the chairman of Cassamarca after the merger; he was replaced by Antonio Romano in October 2000, former chairman of Treviso's Chamber of Commerce.

Cassamarca S.p.A. survived as a subsidiary of the banking group until 2002, which 7 sub-brands of UniCredito Italiano were merged to form UniCredit Banca, as well as other divisions of the banking group, such as UniCredit Banca d'Impresa. As of 31 December 2001, the former direct owner of Cassamarca S.p.A., the Fondazione Cassamarca, owned 2.801% share capital of UniCredito Italiano as the indirect minority owner of Cassamarca S.p.A.; immediately after the merger in 1998, the foundation owned 3.79% share capital of UniCredito Italiano.

== Equity investments ==
As of 31 December 2001

- The Bank of Italy (0.06%)
- Cariverona Ireland (25%)
- Interporto di Venezia (35.14%)
- Veneto Sviluppo (3.75%)

== Banking foundation ==
Logo of the Cassamarca Foundation

Fondazione Cassa di Risparmio della Marca Trivigiana or Cassamarca Foundation (Italian: Fondazione Cassamarca), is a banking foundation which succeed the bank as a charity organization. As of 31 December 2016, the foundation had an equity of €494 million. It also owned 0.23% shares of UniCredit, or 13,963,410 number of shares before 2017 reverse stock split of the bank. The foundation did not write-down the value of the shares of UniCredit, but other foundation did, such as Fondazione CRTrieste, to reflect the market value of the shares. The net loss of the foundation, was also questioned by the Ministry of Economy and Finance.

Dino De Poli was the chairman of the two management boards of the foundation: Consiglio di Indirizzo e di Programmazione and Consiglio di Attuazione e Amministrazione. His term was most recently confirmed in 2016, until 2018 and 2020 respectively.

It was reported that De Poli received €10 million as wage from 1992 to 2017 from the foundation. As part of a reform led by Associazione di Fondazioni e di Casse di Risparmio S.p.A. (ACRI) and the Ministry of Economy and Finance, a new articles of association of the organization was approved in 2016. Some of the member of the Consiglio di Indirizzo e di Programmazione would be elected by the mayor and university professor from Treviso area, which the foundation was obligated to support the area around Treviso. In December 2016, professor Ulderico Bernardi was confirmed as the vice-chairman of the aforementioned board. Some member were also professor, such as Luca Antonini and Ferruccio Bresolin. Local politicians, Giovanni Squizzato and Ubaldo Fanton were also the members of that board.

The foundation is one of the 86 member banking foundations of the ACRI.

In the past, the foundation also purchased former San Leonardo Hospital, Treviso and the adjacent barrack, as a campus for Ca' Foscari University of Venice and the University of Padua. Ca' Foscari and the foundation also had a dispute on the payment of the salary of the staff of the Treviso campus, which the campus was supported by the foundation. The foundation also established the Australasian Centre for Italian Studies (ACIS) with the University of Western Australia in 2002.

The foundation also signed a financial deal with Société Générale in order to subscribe the capital increase of UniCredit in 2012, in order to prevent the dilution of the ownership ratio of the foundation over the bank.

=== Subsidiaries ===
- Appiani 1: SPV for Area Appiani project
- Teatri e Umanesimo Latino: SPV for Palazzo Bortolan

=== Properties ===
- Casa Brittoni
- Ca' dei Carraresi
- Ca' Spineda
- former Monte di Pietà di Treviso headquarters – re-acquired from UniCredit in 2004

=== Arts collection ===
located in the headquarters of the former mount of piety

- Celesti, Andrea (1701). Cristo deposto con angelo.
- Fiumicelli, Ludovico [in Italian]. La moltiplicazione dei pani e dei pesci [Feeding the multitude].
- Florigerio, Sebastiano. Cristo Morto con angeli.
- Girolamo da Treviso (1478). La morte della Vergine.
- Lorenzo di Credi. Madonna col Bambino e angeli.
- Orioli, Bartolomeo [in Italian] (1614). I Profeti Geremia e Isaia.
- Pozzoserrato, Lodovico. Elia sfamato dal corvo.
- Pozzoserrato, Lodovico. Il convito di Epulone.
- Pozzoserrato, Lodovico. Agar e l'angelo.
- Pozzoserrato, Lodovico. Il buon samaritano [The good samaritan].
- Pozzoserrato, Lodovico. Mose fa saturire l'acqua nel deserto.
- Pozzoserrato, Lodovico. Il ritorno del Figliuol prodigo [the Return of the Prodigal Son].

== See also ==
- Banca della Marca, a co-operative bank
- Centromarca Banca, a co-operative bank
- Banca di Treviso, a defunct bank that was acquired by Südtiroler Volksbank – Banca Popolare dell'Alto Adige
- Banca Popolare di Treviso, also known as Banca Popolare di Castelfranco Veneto, a defunct co-operative bank that was acquired by Banca Popolare di Vicenza
- Cassa di Risparmio del Veneto, fellow savings bank in Veneto, a subsidiary of Intesa Sanpaolo
- Cassa di Risparmio di Venezia, fellow savings bank in Veneto, a defunct subsidiary of Intesa Sanpaolo
- Cassa di Risparmio di Verona, Vicenza, Belluno e Ancona, formed Unicredito with Cassa di Risparmio della Marca Trivigiana
- Veneto Banca, a defunct co-operative bank headquartered in the Province of Treviso, also known as Banca Popolare di Asolo e Montebelluna and Banca Popolare di Montebelluna
- List of banks in Italy
