= Domenico Tibaldi =

Italian painter and architect

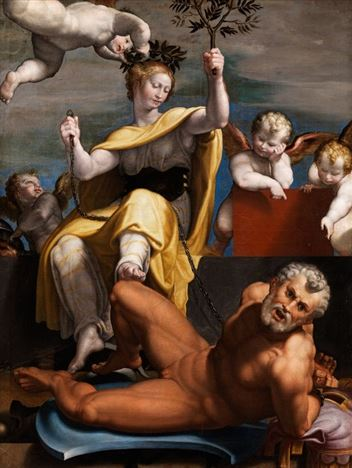
Allegory of Peace Defeating War

Domenico Tibaldi (1541, Bologna - 1583, Bologna) was an Italian architect and painter. He was a major exponent of the Bolognese Mannerist style

== Life and work ==
He was the son of Tebaldo Tibaldi, an architect, and the younger brother of Pellegrino Tibaldi, also an architect and painter, who gave him his first lessons. In addition to his brother, he was Influenced by Jacopo Barozzi da Vignola.

Three of his architectural works stand out: the renovation of the Cattedrale Metropolitana di San Pietro, with the construction of the main chapel and the courtyard of the nearby Archbishop's Palace (1575), the Palazzo Magnani (1576-87), now the local offices of Unicredit, and the Palazzo Mattei (1578).

He was also an engraver, creating reproductions of works by Titian, Parmigianino and Bartolomeo Passarotti, as well as a few original works. His best known student was Agostino Carracci. He was interred at the Church of the Annunciation in Bologna.

== Sources ==
- Francesco Ceccarelli, Deanna Lenzi; Domenico e Pellegrino Tibaldi: architettura e arte a Bologna nel secondo Cinquecento, Marsilio Editori, 2011 ISBN 978-88-317-0909-5
- Milizia, Francesco (1826). The Lives of Celebrated Architects, Ancient and Modern: With Historical and Critical Observations on Their Works, and on the Principles of the Art. Vol. 2. Translated by Eliza Taylor Cresy. London: J. Taylor.
