= Palazzo Magnani, Bologna =

Renaissance palace in central Bologna

Coordinates: 44°29′44.02″N 11°20′55.03″E

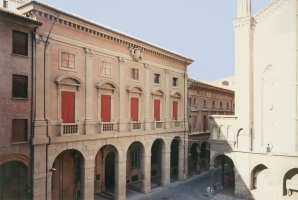
The late Renaissance façade of the palace.

Palazzo Magnani is a Renaissance palace located on Via Zamboni number 20 in central Bologna, region of Emilia Romagna, Italy, built by the Magnani noble family with the same name.

Construction on the palace began in 1577 under architect Domenico Tibaldi until his death in 1583. Floriano Ambrosini then took over the architectural duties. In 1797 the palace became a property of the Guidotti family. In the late 19th century they sold it to the Malvezzi-Campeggi family whose coat of arms is still visible on the façade. The Palazzo Malvezzi Campeggi rises adjacent to this one, just northeast along Via Zamboni. Subsequently, Palazzo Magnani was inhabited by the Salem family. Currently it is the local office for the Unicredit (was a headquarter of Rolo Banca and Credito Romagnolo ).

Among the most important artworks in the interior is the frescoed frieze of Histories of the Foundation of Rome executed in 1590 by the painters Ludovico, Annibale and Agostino Carracci in the salone on the piano nobile. Also notable is the monumental chimney by Ambrosini, decorated by statues of Minerva and Mars by Gabriele Fiorini, and surmounted by the Lupercalia by Annibale Carracci. In the inner courtyard is a statue of "Hercules" whose face is that of Lorenzo Magnani, who had commissioned the Carracci's frieze.
