= Andrea Orcel =

Italian investment banker (born 1963)

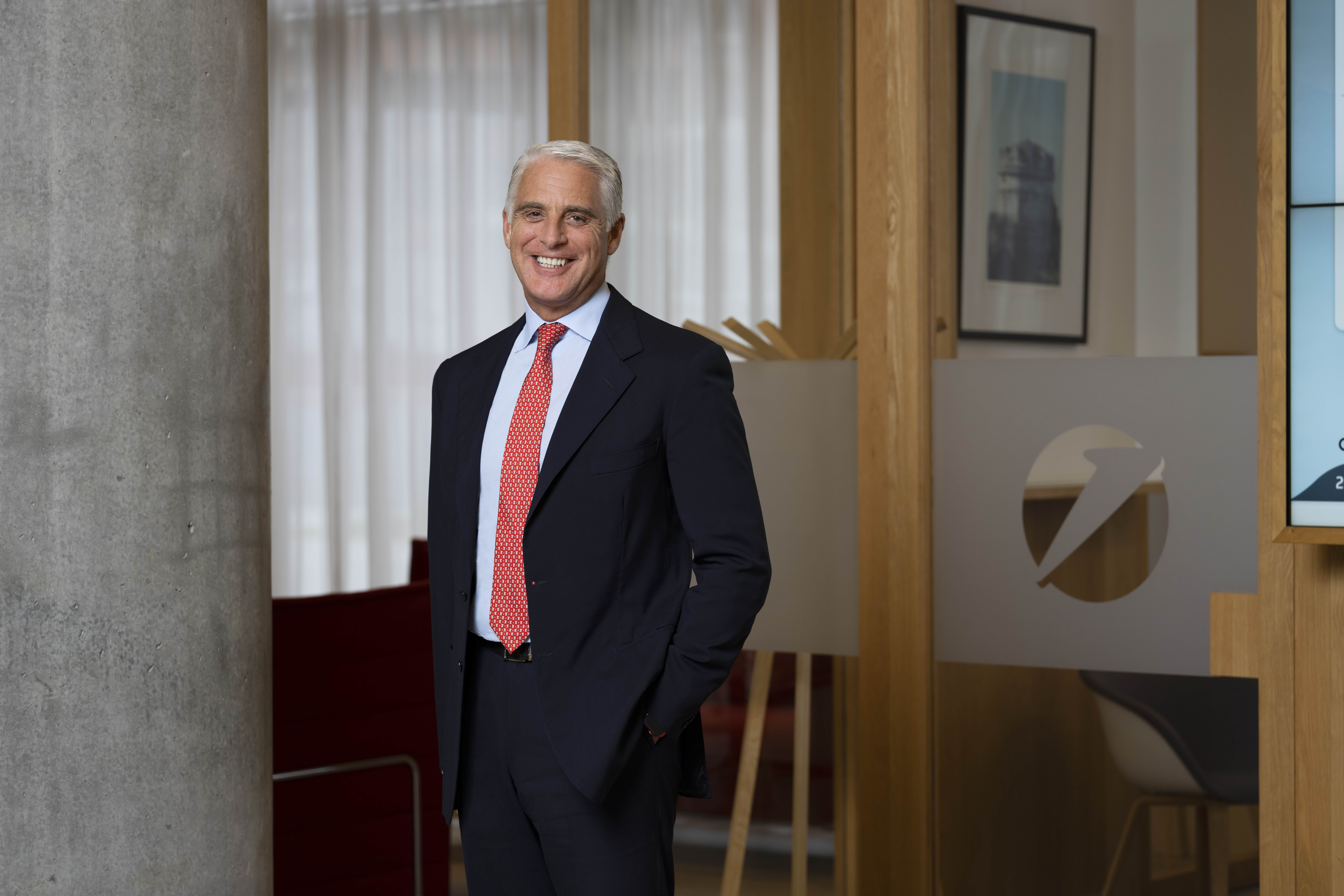
- Orcel in 2021
- Born: May 14, 1963 (age 63); Rome, Italy
- Education: University of Rome; INSEAD
- Occupation: Investment banker
- Years active: 1987–present
- Spouse: Clara Batalim-Orcel (m. 2009)
- Children: 1

Andrea Orcel (Italian: [anˈdrɛːa orˈtʃɛl]; born May 14, 1963) is an Italian investment banker who is CEO of UniCredit. He was the president of UBS Investment Bank from November 2014 to September 2018. He was poised to take on the role of Chief Executive of Banco Santander from September 2018 to January 2019; however, the job offer was withdrawn which resulted in him taking legal action against Santander. In December 2021, a judge awarded him €68m in compensation, including €10m for moral damages. Orcel started his own boutique investment bank before taking the role at UniCredit.

Orcel is a controversial figure in European business and international banking. He has been called one of the most successful investment bankers of his generation. Orcel has also been routinely criticized for his abrasive management style, overworking subordinates, and being hyper-competitive.

== Early life and education ==
Andrea Orcel was born on May 14, 1963, in Rome, Italy. His father ran a small leasing company and his mother worked for the United Nations. Orcel attended the Lycée français Chateaubriand in Rome for secondary school, at his mother's request, so he could learn French in addition to his native Italian. Orcel attended the University of Rome, Sapienza, majoring in economics and commerce. While a university student, he reportedly skipped class, as attendance was optional, and went backpacking in South America before returning to take his final exams. He has stated that a vacation to the United States when he was 18 convinced him to go into banking. He graduated summa cum laude with an undergraduate thesis on hostile takeovers. He went on to attend the INSEAD business school in Fontainebleau, France.

== Career ==
=== Merrill Lynch ===
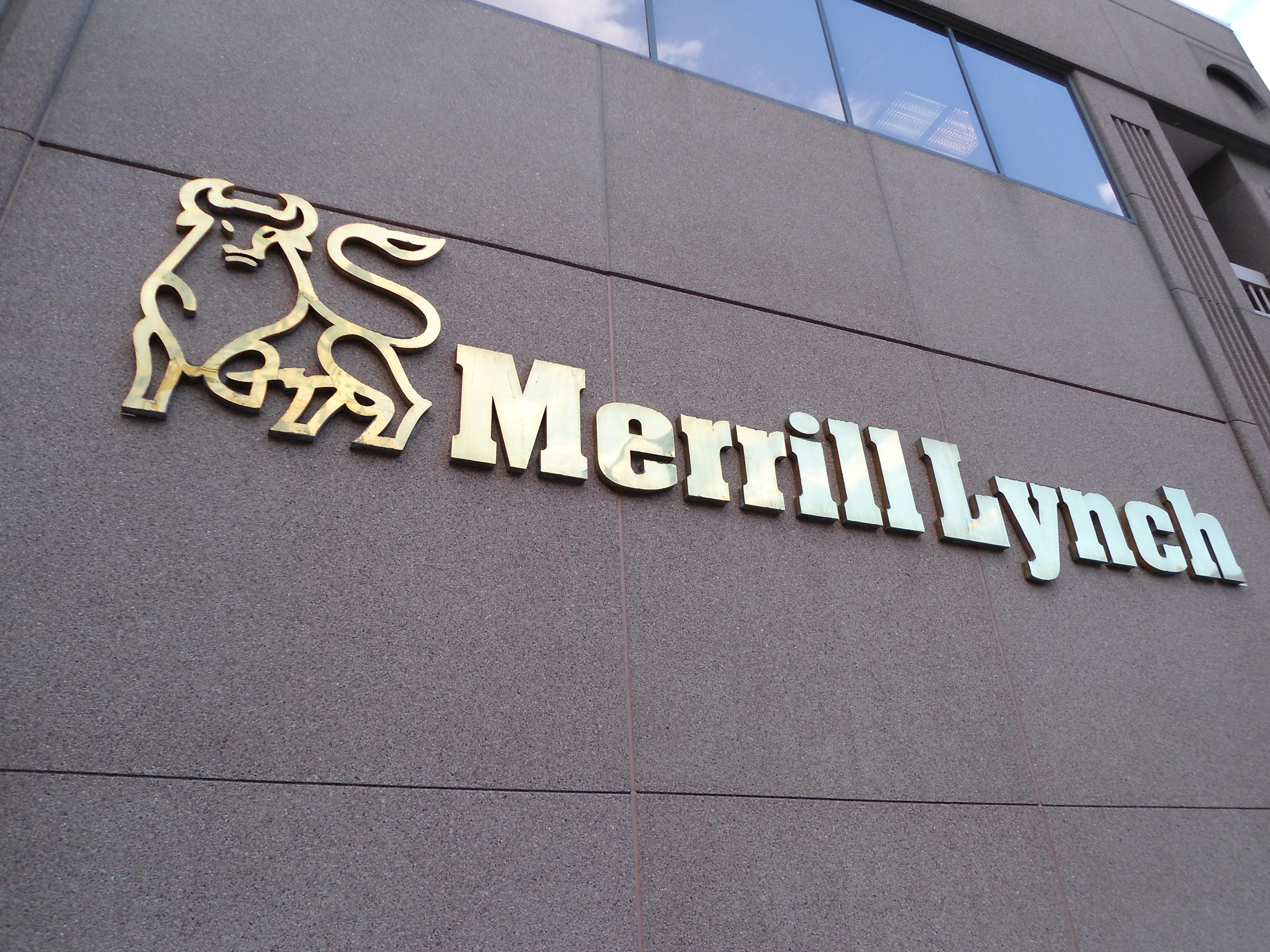
Orcel worked at Merrill Lynch & Co. from 1992 to 2012.

After graduating in 1986, Orcel began his career in fixed income at Midland Montagu in 1987. He moved to Goldman Sachs in 1988 and, after completing his MBA at INSEAD, joined Boston Consulting Group in Paris in 1990, remaining there until 1992. In 1992, he was asked to join Merrill Lynch & Co. in their Financial Institutions Group (FIG) in London. Orcel orchestrated the $25 billion (€21.2 billion) merger of Italian banking groups, Credito Italiano and Unicredito to form banking conglomerate UniCredit in 1998. UniCredito had originally planned to go public but the stock market valuation proposed by bankers at a rival investment bank made UniCredito "unhappy". Orcel called the bank and offered to explore the possibility of a merger with a comparable company and brought them to Merrill Lynch a week later. The merger made UniCredit the largest bank in Italy. The following year, he was the advisor on the $13 billion (€11 billion) merger of Banco Bilbao Vizcaya and Argentaria to create BBVA. BBVA became the second largest bank in Spain after the merger. Orcel was head of the Global FIG team from 2003 to 2007, succeeding Joseph Willit. In 2004, Orcel initiated Spanish bank Santander's acquisition of British bank Abbey National, expanding the bank's operations into the United Kingdom in a deal valued at $15.6 billion (£13.8 billion). He was tapped by the Royal Bank of Scotland Group (RBS) in 2007 to advise on a $55 billion (£49 billion) acquisition of ABN Amro. The deal was orchestrated by Orcel after he brought in Fortis and Santander to execute a three-way consortium bid for ABN Amro. At the time, the bid set a record for the largest merger or acquisition in financial services history. For the acquisition, Merrill Lynch received $12 million (£7.5 million) in advisory fees. Months later, the 2008 financial crisis reduced the capital buffers of banks all over the world, causing major damage to RBS and forcing the UK Government to seize control. The Institutional Investor labeled Orcel "one of the most controversial bankers of the financial crisis".

In November 2008, Orcel's team at Merrill Lynch valued the Italian bank Banca Antonveneta at $10 billion (€9 billion), advising Monte dei Paschi (MPS) to acquire it from Santander for the same amount. Internal valuations of the bank at Santander had Banca Antonveneta valued at $7.4 billion (€6.5 billion). The deal was described as ill-advised and "flawed" as MPS overpaid $2.85 billion (€2.5 billion) for its new acquisition, leaving it with capital deficiencies. During the 2008 financial crisis, Orcel brought in $550 million (€483 million) in advisory fees for the bank, earning him 2007 compensation of $38 million (£33 million). His bonus sparked an investigation into executive compensation by the New York Attorney General; no charges were brought forward against Orcel or Merrill Lynch.

In July 2008, Orcel advised Santander on its $1.6 billion (€1.45 billion) acquisition of Alliance & Leicester, a British bank and former building society. On January 30, 2009, Santander hired Orcel once more to complete their acquisition of Sovereign Bank, in a deal valued at roughly $1.9 billion (€1.4 billion). In 2009, Orcel was asked to serve as the executive chairman of the investment bank, eventually being appointed chief executive of European Card Services. In February 2011, Orcel brokered the $3.3 billion (€2.9 billion) initial public offering (IPO) of a 10% stake of VTB Bank from the Russian government with his brother Riccardo. Orcel led a team to execute an $8.5 billion (€7.5 billion) rights offering for UniCredit, at the height of the Eurozone crisis in January 2012. Recalled as the "scariest [moment] of his career", he broke through Merrill Lynch's risk limits to secure the deal, drawing widespread industry attention. In April 2012, Orcel was tapped by Swiss investment bank UBS CEO Sergio Ermotti to lead their sell side and UK operations. Two of Merrill Lynch's largest corporate clients, UniCredit and Santander, reportedly transferred their business to UBS, following Orcel.

=== UBS ===
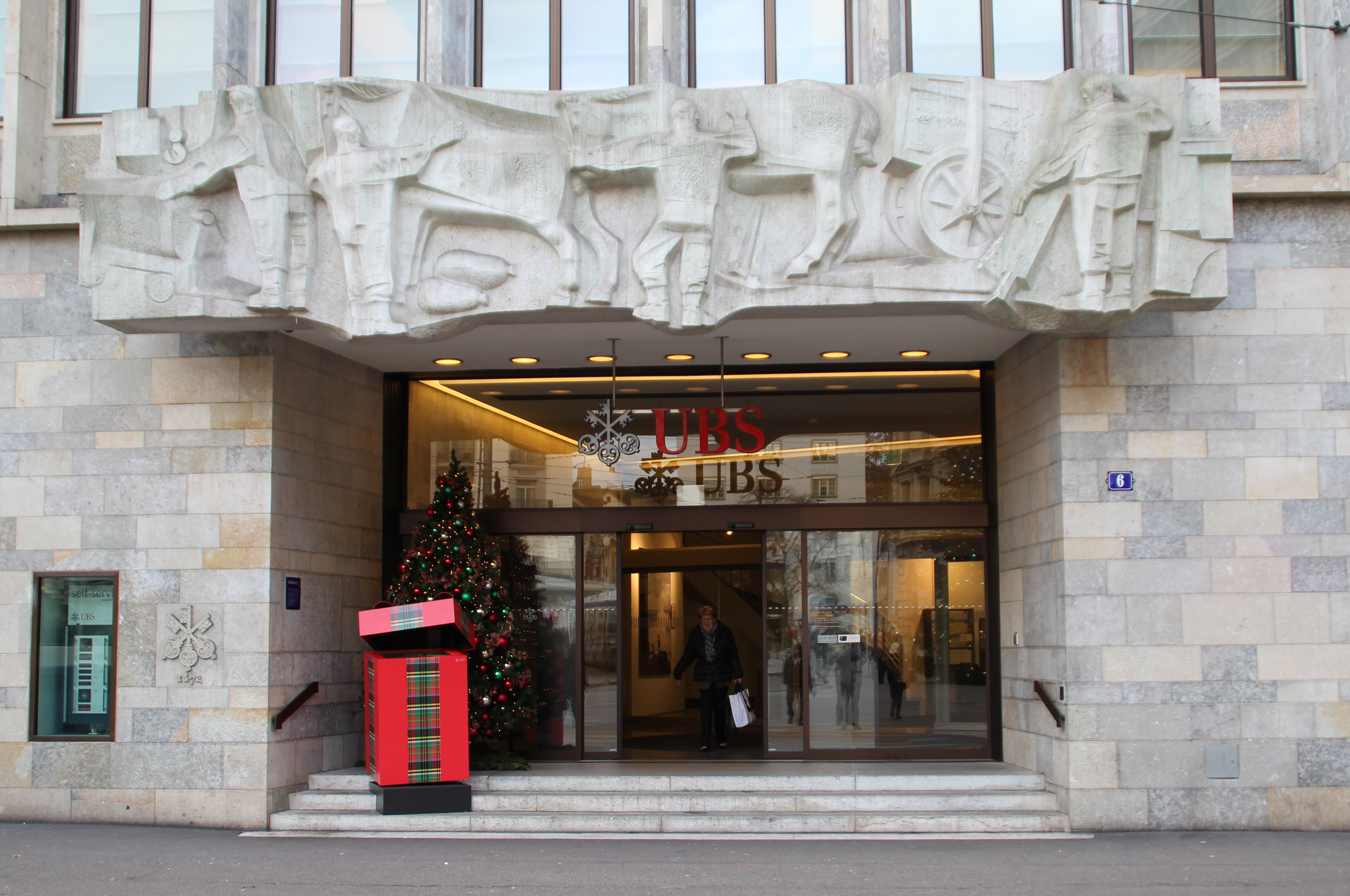
Orcel worked at the UBS Investment Bank from 2012 to 2018.

Following the 2011 UBS rogue trader scandal and a corporate restructuring, Orcel was invited to the group executive board and appointed the co-CEO of the investment banking unit of UBS. In November 2012, he was asked to serve as the CEO of UBS AG–the main private banking unit of UBS Group AG before taking sole control of the investment bank. Upon his acceptance of the position, UBS paid Orcel Sfr6.3 million in cash and awarded him Sfr18.5 million in stock options, for a total sign-on bonus of Sfr25 million (£17 million, $26.2 million, or €23 million). In January 2013, following the Libor scandal, Orcel was called before the British Parliament's banking standards commission to explain the company's role in the scandal. Present for nearly three hours of testimony, he expressed regret for the firm's role and stated to commissioner Andrew Tyrie: "we all got probably too arrogant, too self-convinced that things were correct the way they were. I think the industry needs to change." Later that year he was compensated $26 million, in line with a 7% clawback of the company's bonus pool. Although he was hired in a primarily managerial role, he continued to advise some of the firm's higher profile clients and institutional partners. In March 2013, Orcel rejoined his brother Riccardo to negotiate an investment into VTB from a Qatari sovereign wealth fund. From early 2013 to late 2014 Orcel initiated a corporate restructuring of the investment bank, to "[stop] trying to be the biggest investment bank and [focus] on being the best". With a focus on return-on-investment (ROI), deleveraging, and cost reduction, Orcel increased majority capital positions while diminishing the size of the bank. In May 2015, he was the highest earning executive at UBS Group AG, grossing $8 million in base salary. In June 2016, Orcel offered MPS–a client of his at Merrill Lynch during the 2008 financial crisis–$5.6 billion (€5 billion) in debt and equity when it was facing liquidity issues and was reaching out to a handful of banks. Orcel made this offer to counter a bailout by the Italian government but was jointly rejected by the Italian prime minister Matteo Renzi and MPS. In February 2016, he orchestrated the merger of Vodafone's and Liberty Global's operations in the Netherlands to create a joint venture in a deal worth $1.1 billion (€1 billion).

From 2012 to 2017. Orcel fired thousands of employees in order to boost profitability, reducing the company's wage requirements by $3 billion. He reportedly handed lists of people to fire to managing directors, with many UBS employees learning of their firing as they came to work and "found their access cards no longer worked." In May 2017, he approved a $2.8 billion (€2.6 billion) financing package to Chinese conglomerate HNA Group so they could buy a 10% stake in Deutsche Bank. In August 2018, an Investment Bank trainee accused one of the managing directors of UBS of drugging and sexually assaulting her at a social gathering in September. Orcel personally invited her to his London office to clarify that the director had been suspended and subsequently resigned. Orcel appeared on Bloomberg Markets later that day explaining a revamped infrastructure and process of handling sexual misconduct at the company, noting it must be "completely eradicated". In the months preceding October 2018, Orcel reportedly "lobbied intensely" to be the next CEO of UBS. After giving in to Orcel, UBS put him directly in line to succeed Ermotti.

=== Santander ===
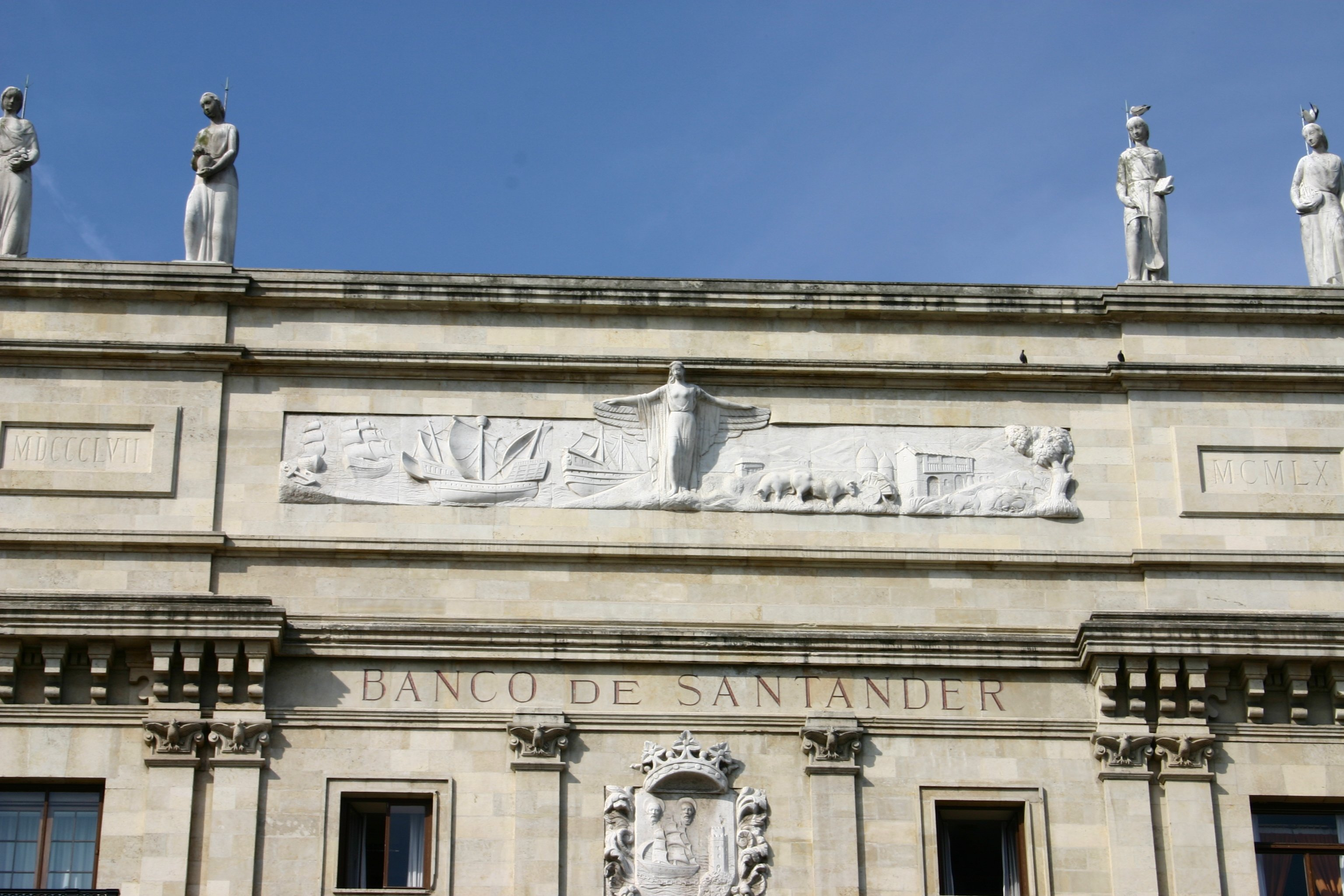
Orcel was slated to join Banco Santander as its chief executive from September 2018 to January 2019.

In September 2018, Ana Botín announced that Orcel would lead Spanish commercial bank and financial services company Banco Santander as its CEO, starting early 2019. Orcel formally left UBS on September 30, 2018. His appointment to the chief executive made him the first non-Spanish individual to be nominated for such a high-ranking position at the company. Despite being a traditional mergers and acquisitions banker, Orcel expressed interest in staving off banking digitization instead of acquiring more banks or merging with other large banks. As Orcel left UBS, his employment contract included variable remuneration valued at $21.3 million (€18.5 million). Santander agreed to pay Orcel this remuneration as a part of his sign-on bonus on October 19, 2018, if UBS did not pay it.

In January 2019, UBS refused to pay out his deferred stock options, enforcing a "hard-lined" departure policy. This triggered his offer of employment at Santander to absorb the complete cost of those deferred stock options. The total amount Santander had to pay to hire Orcel increased from $21.3 million to more than $50.7 million (€50 million). One estimate had the total cost of Orcel's contract to be as high as $60 million. Santander could only cover a third of that amount.

Orcel was released from his contract and regained his UBS deferred stock options. Industry reaction to the news was mixed with Euromoney stating: "If Santander wanted him, it should have paid for him"; The Economist noted the political backlash Santander would face for hiring Orcel after the 2008–2014 Spanish financial crisis. The Spanish bank offered Orcel capital to start his own investment bank after withdrawing their job offer but he declined. In July 2019, Orcel launched a €100 million ($113 million) breach-of-contract lawsuit against Santander. In December 2021, a court in Madrid ruled that he should be awarded €68m in compensation from Santander. This figure was adjusted in January 2022 to €51.4m of which €18.6m was to be in the form of Santander shares over seven years, plus an additional €10m for moral and reputational damage.

=== CEO UniCredit ===
On January 27, 2021, the board of UniCredit named Orcel as CEO, taking the place of Jean Pierre Mustier. In April 2021, Orcel became the CEO. During his tenure, UniCredit was highlighted as one of Europe's top-performing banks with significant upside potential according to UBS. Additionally, the bank increased its revenue and capital goals as profits exceeded estimates

In March 2022, Orcel received criticism over his pay packet of $2.7 million. In a letter signed by Andrea Vintani, the bank argued that the amount was "in line with compensation at other comparable banks" and was "between the median and third quartile" of their European peers and that any arguments made against it were "incorrect and may lead to wrong conclusions". Reports from the Financial Times also highlighted the bank's continued strong financial performance. Moreover, CNBC reported that UniCredit surpassed its 2023 targets following a strong quarter. During his time as CEO, Orcel focused on cutting costs, streamlining UniCredit's operations and strengthening its financial position. These changes helped the bank improve its performance and increase returns to shareholders.

Orcel's efforts resulted in him being named Banker of the Year by Euromoney in 2024.

In September 2024 Orcel's declaration that UniCredit had bought a 9% stake in the capital of the German Commerzbank made waves in the German political establishment. The move was praised by Italian MFA Antonio Tajani. The German government owns a large portion of Commerzbank because of its intercession during the 2008 financial crisis.

Over the following months, UniCredit continued buying shares and using financial derivatives to increase its stake in Commerzbank as Orcel pursued a possible takeover of the bank.

In November 2026, Orcel said Commerzbank's restructuring would begin with senior management, with plans to reduce management levels and make the organization more efficient.

== Management style ==
Orcel's management style has widely been received as valuing hard work and presenteeism, and being performance-driven. Orcel has stated in interviews that his favorite book is Angela Duckworth's Grit: The Power of Passion and Perseverance, whose central thesis is that "the secret to success is not raw talent, but rather a blend of passion and persistence." Orcel's personality and management philosophy has been criticized for not facilitating team work, isolating those who do not perform, and being high maintenance. In response to this criticism, he has stated that he was "not easy" and "demanding" but not willing to "ask for something I'm not doing myself." Additionally, he has stated that people should not "generalize what a few people with an objective say about [him]." In May 2015, he also denied allegations that he asked junior bankers to skip vacations and come in on holidays. Orcel was quoted as respecting a banker's choice to "cancel their holidays themselves so they can stick around to help with a deal", but doesn't demand it of them. After a Bank of America intern died from working 72 hours straight in 2013, many banking executives, including Orcel, were pressured to reform their scheduling. He rebuffed the calls for change and declined to amend the working hours of UBS junior bankers. Multiple profiles of Orcel undertaken by the Financial Times describe him as 'voraciously competitive', capable of "[losing] his temper in a typical Italian way", "[shouting] at people sometimes". Orcel has repeatedly stated that, due to the competitive nature of banking, one in four (25% of) mergers and acquisition (M&A) bankers do not make it past entry-level positions.

"Fiat is not the same as Audi, and Audi is not the same as Porsche, and Porsche is not the same as Ferrari. They are all in the auto industry, but they are addressing different markets and, depending on the dynamic in those segments, they are likely to do better or worse. The revenues are not the key determinant in terms of performance — ROE, or profitability, in terms of what is returned to shareholders, is a more significant measure of success."

— Orcel, on the modern investment banking market, February 2017

Orcel frequently uses the Italian auto-manufacturer Ferrari to describe his affection for "focused" and "lean" execution of strategies as opposed to bigger, less versatile banks, i.e. as opposed to a Fiat automobile. He similarly uses European football to describe such strategies, referring to UBS as the "Croatia of investment banking" following the 2018 FIFA World Cup final. In June 2016, Orcel led an initiative where UBS bankers were granted two hours of "personal time" every week in order to boost work–life balance. On March 31, 2017, Orcel expressed his affection for shared parental leave and voiced his support for the growing movement in Europe to let fathers and mothers take extended time off of work to be with newly born and young children. In April 2018 Orcel issued an internal memo to UBS managing directors requiring that they hold 250 to 300 client meetings a year. This memo reportedly initiated a mass exodus of senior investment bank leadership in late 2017, as the latest in a series of "frequently changing strategies".

Shortly after announcing the new directive, Orcel initiated a client meeting monitoring system that culminated in further departures. Employees of the bank who missed meeting targets received e-mail rebukes from Orcel and other executives. An unnamed senior executive at the investment bank stated: "[Andrea Orcel] is the best banker I've ever worked with and the worst manager I've ever seen" after the directive hit international presses.

On October 15, 2018, Orcel was at the center of a Financial News London editorial investigation into his management style. The editorial team interviewed a variety of UBS executives with whom he had worked with from November 2012 to September 2018. The report concluded that Orcel had a "pattern of aggressive behavior towards other executives".

Select accounts asserted that Orcel pursued personal vendettas against detractors, often wishing to "make examples of out [his colleagues]". Unnamed UBS executives argued that the report sensationalized internal misunderstandings and communication failures. UBS and Santander both issued statements that disagreed with the characterization and findings of the report.

== Public image and legacy ==
Orcel has been called the "Ronaldo of investment banking" and a "deal junkie" by the international press and select British government officials. Spanish media has called him el tiburón de las finanzas globales ("the shark of global finance"). In France and Italy, he is known as the requin alpha de la finance ("alpha shark of finance") and the re dei deal-maker ("king of deal makers"), respectively. After moving from UBS to Santander in 2019, the New York Times estimated that Orcel was likely "Europe's most famous investment banker." He has been noted by Financial Times as one of "the most successful investment bankers of his generation". From 1988 to 2018, Orcel was widely seen as "[orchestrating] some of the world's biggest corporate transactions."

After his move from UBS to Santander was cancelled by the latter in 2019, Metro wrote that "the rupture that followed the meeting turned into one of the bitterest and highest-profile employment disputes in recent European history." Sophie Perryer, writing for World Finance, analysed the nuances of Orcel's cancelled move to Santander and how "Orcel’s character and personality traits have always been closely entwined with his illustrious career".

Additionally, Andrea Orcel's legacy in the banking sector is underscored by his significant role in mergers and acquisitions and his leadership at UniCredit. His recognition as Euromoney's Banker of the Year in 2024 further highlights his influence and achievements in the industry. Orcel continues to be a prominent figure in global finance, focusing on driving growth and innovation both within UniCredit and beyond.

== Personal life ==
Orcel speaks five languages fluently.

He is married to Clara Batalim-Orcel, a Portuguese interior designer. They have one daughter. His younger brother, Riccardo, worked as an investment banker with Orcel at Merrill Lynch & Co. during the late 2000s. He was appointed deputy chief executive of VTB Bank in July 2013 and has occasionally worked with Andrea on mutual deals.

== Career statistics ==
=== Dealmaking ===
As of market close 8 March 2020

Dealmaking by bank, fiscal year, and market value
Bank	FY	MKT	M&A							IPO / RO		Total Value ($B)
Bank	FY	MKT	Entity A	Entity B	Final Entity	Value ($B)	Acquirer	Target	Value ($B)	Issuer	Value ($B)	Total Value ($B)
Merrill Lynch & Co.	1998–99	Bulge Bracket	Credito Italiano	UniCredito	UniCredit	25 (Note: The market value of the deal established UniCredit as the largest banking institution in Italy.)	–	–	–	–	–	25
Merrill Lynch & Co.	1999–00	Bulge Bracket	Banco Bilbao Vizcaya	Argentaria	BBVA	11 (Note: The market value of the deal established BBVA as the second largest banking institution in Spain.)	–	–	–	–	–	11
Merrill Lynch & Co.	2004–05	Bulge Bracket	–	–	–	–	Banco Santander	Abbey National	15.56	–	–	15.56
Merrill Lynch & Co.	2007–08	Bulge Bracket	–	–	–	–	Royal Bank of Scotland	ABN Amro	55 (Note: This was later identified as setting the record for "the largest deal in financial services history" in 2007.)	–	–	55
Merrill Lynch & Co.	2007–08	Bulge Bracket	–	–	–	–	Banco Santander	Alliance & Leicester	1.6	–	–	1.6
Merrill Lynch & Co.	2008–09	Bulge Bracket	–	–	–	–	Monte dei Paschi	Banca Antonveneta	10	10% stake of VTB Bank	3.3	13.3
Merrill Lynch & Co.	2008–09	Bulge Bracket	–	–	–	–	Banco Santander	Sovereign Bank	1.9	–	–	1.9
Merrill Lynch & Co.	Total					36	Total		84.06	Total	3.3	123.39
Bank of America Merrill Lynch	2011-12	Bulge Bracket	–	–	–	–	–	–	–	Rights offering: UniCredit	8.5	8.5
Bank of America Merrill Lynch	Total					–	Total		–	Total	8.5	8.5
UBS	2016–17	Bulge Bracket	Vodafone's Dutch operations	Liberty Global's Dutch operations	Joint Venture	1.1	–	–	–	–	–	1.1
UBS	2017–18	Bulge Bracket	–	–	–	–	HNA Group	10% stake in Deutsche Bank	2.8	–	–	2.8
UBS	Total					1.1	Total		–	Total	–	3.9
Career total						37.1			82.16		11.8	135.76

=== Sign-ons ===
From	To	Position	Bonus ($M)	Bonus (€M)	Date	References
Merrill Lynch & Co.	Bank of America Merrill Lynch	Executive Chairman of the Investment Bank	$34.0 (Note: Orcel worked at Merrill Lynch & Co. from 1992 to 2012, a firm that was acquired by Bank of America in 2009 to create Bank of America Merrill Lynch. He was appointed Executive Chairman of the Investment Bank in the transition, receiving a sign-on bonus of $34 million (€29 million).)	€29.0	2009	
Bank of America Merrill Lynch	UBS	Investment Bank President	$26.2 (Note: Upon his acceptance of the position, UBS paid Orcel Sfr6.3 million in cash and awarded him Sfr18.5 million in stock options, for a total sign-on bonus of Sfr25 million (£17 million, US$26.2 million, or €23 million).)	€23.0	2012	
UBS	Banco Santander	Chief Executive Officer (CEO)	$21.3 (Note: As Orcel abruptly left UBS, his employment contract included variable remuneration valued at $21.3 million (€18.5 million). Santander bought out his contract, paying Orcel this remuneration as a part of his sign-on bonus on October 19, 2018.)	€18.5	2019	

== See also ==
- List of Sapienza University of Rome alumni
- List of INSEAD alumni
- List of former employees of Goldman Sachs
