= East forum Berlin =

east forum Berlin
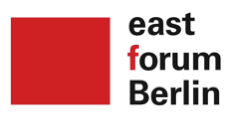
- Frequency: Annually
- Locations: Berlin, Germany
- Inaugurated: 2013 by Achim Oelgarth and Rainer Lindner and since 2015 with Ivonne Bollow
- Most recent: April 2015
- Participants: 250 to 350 from 30 countries
- Organiser: UniCredit, METRO GROUP, Ost-Ausschuss der Deutschen Wirtschaft, Federal State of Berlin
- Website: www.eastforum-berlin.de

Every year, the east forum Berlin brings together opinion leaders from the political and business worlds in the East and the West to discuss challenges and opportunities faced by the economic area from Lisbon to Vladivostok and beyond. It was founded in 2013.

The overall aim of the east forum Berlin is to facilitate dialogue, exchange know-how and intensify networks.

== east forum Berlin 2015 ==
The third east forum Berlin was devoted to the opportunities and challenges for a common economic space from Lisbon to Vladivostok. The central issues of the forum were economic reforms aimed at external stabilization and a progress assessment.

== east forum Berlin 2016 ==
It is the 4th forum that took place during Germany's OSCE Chairmanship in the middle of new deadlocks and new dynamics that characterise the transforming economic and political realities between Europe and the East. Generally, the event focused on Europe's economic future. One of the main topics was the trade relations between the European Union and the Eurasian Economic Union, and China's Silk Road Initiative.

The two opposing trends are embedded in new division lines, leading to an unfamiliar status quo of alienation. Secondly, they are surrounded by recently formed alliances consisting of as yet poorly known stakeholders, which create new spheres of influence. These dynamics offer potential for growth but also involve geopolitical and geo-economic challenges for all stakeholders in the region.

== east forum, Berlin 2017 ==
The title of the forum was: "The future of European and Eurasian partnership: Rebuilding trust. Defining drivers. Overcoming barriers".

== List of speakers since 2013 ==
Name	Name	Name	Name	Name	Name
Mikhail Alekseev	Dr Gernot Erler	Andrzej Kopyrski	Ara Nranyan	Bakytzhan Sagintayev	Dr de:Volker Treier
Chris Antonopoulos	Joschka Fischer	Prof Hans-Helmut Kotz	Günther Oettinger	Dr Harald Schwager	Jérôme Vacher
Dr Anders Åslund	Mark Frese	Alena Kupchyna	Dr Heinz Olbers	Giuseppe Scognamiglio	Prof Günter Verheugen
Dr Péter Balás	Dr Ricardo Giucci	Giorgi Kvirikashvili	Marcus Osegowitsch	Željko Sertić	Dr Giuseppe Vita
Gianfranco Bisagni	Alexey Grigoriev	Iurie Leancă	Djoomart Otorbaev	Pavlo Sheremeta	Carlo Vivaldi
Dr Wolf-Ruthart Born	Alexei Gromyko	Rasim Ljajić	Gianni Franco Papa	Igor Shuvalov	Hristiyana Vucheva
Dr Karl Brauner	Dr Azra Hadziahmetovic	Kristjan Maruste	Bill Pavleski	Dmytro Shymkiv	Dr Theo Waigel
Vasile Bumacov	Dr Johannes Hahn	Dr Hans-Jürgen Meyer	Daniels Pavluts	Andrei Slepnev	Niko Warbanoff
Dr Erhard Busek	James Hansen	Frauke Mispage	Gerhard Pfeifer	Stephan Steinlein	Siegfried Wolf
Fikret Čaušević	Fadil Ismajli	Lubomir Mitov	Alain Pilloux	Dr Frank-Walter Steinmeier	Klaus Wowereit
Sir Suma Chakrabarti	Florin Nicolae Jianu	Jan Mládek	Dmitri Polyanskiy	Ludwig Soukup	Cornelia Yzer
Cathrina Claas-Mühlhäuser	Guido Kerkhoff	Dr Peter Mooslechner	Friedrich A. Rather	Dmytro Tabachnyk	Dr Guido Westerwelle
Dr Eckhard Cordes	Viktor Khristenko	Michael Müller	Dr Albert Rau	Dr Johannes Teyssen	Wolfgang Büchele
Lutz Diederichs	Dr Thomas Kirchberg	Dr Christian Nagel	Johannes Regenbrecht	Hashim Thaçi	Witold Waszczykowski
Vjačeslavs Dombrovskis	Olaf Koch	Erik Nielsen	Janusz Reiter	Emmanuel Thomassin	Ulrich Grillo
Mircea Ciopraga	Dr Michael Diederich	Niko Warbanoff	Wang Dezhan	Prof Dr Rainer Lindner	Volker Treier
Vache Gabrielyan	Elena Burmistrova	Klaus Schäfer	Zhecho Stankov	Pieter Boone	Philipp Rösler

== Organization ==
The east forum Berlin has been founded by Achim Oelgarth, Rainer Lindner as well as Ivonne Bollow and is organized by UniCredit, Metro Group, and the Committee on Eastern European Economic Relations (Ost-Ausschuss der Deutschen Wirtschaft) in cooperation with the Federal State of Berlin. Since 2016 BDI and DIHK have joined as well. Media partners are eastonline and Ost-Ausschuss Informationen. Participation is by invitations only, which are extended to representatives from politics and business.

== See also ==
- Economic Council Germany
