= Cassa di Risparmio di Verona, Vicenza, Belluno e Ancona =

Italian savings bank

- Trade name: Cariverona Banca
- Formerly: Civica Cassa di Risparmio di Verona; Cassa di Risparmio di Verona; Cassa di Risparmio di Verona e Vicenza; Cassa di Risparmio di Verona, Vicenza e Belluno
- Company type: Statutory Corporation (until 1991); Subsidiary (since 1991); Società per azioni (since 1991)
- Founded: 1825 in Verona; 1991 (as S.p.A.)
- Defunct: 1 July 2002
- Successor: Fondazione Cariverona; UniCredit Banca
- Headquarters: Verona, Italy
Number of locations
▲501	(2000)
▲513	(2001)
Net income
€322 million	(2000)
▲€392 million	(2001)
Total equity
€1.879 billion	(2000)
▲€2.022 billion	(2001)
- Owner: UniCredit (99.77%)
- Number of employees: ▲5,083 (2000)
- Parent: UniCredit
Subsidiaries
Cariverona Ireland	(75%)
Gestiveneto SGR	(100%)
Quercia Software	(100%)
- Website: www.cariverona.it
- Footnotes / references source: 2000 financial figures was originally in Italian lira, but at that time already pegged with euro

Cassa di Risparmio di Verona, Vicenza, Belluno e Ancona, also known by the shorthand Cariverona, was an Italian savings bank headquartered in Verona. It was formed in 1825 from a division of the Monte di Pietà di Verona, itself founded in 1490.

In 1991, due to Legge Amato, the bank was split into two organizations: a commercial bank still named Cassa di Risparmio di Verona, Vicenza, Belluno e Ancona S.p.A., trading as Cariverona Banca; and the non-profit Fondazione Cassa di Risparmio di Verona, Vicenza, Belluno e Ancona. In 1994, Cariverona merged with the smaller Cassa di Risparmio della Marca Trivigiana to form Unicredito, which in turn merged in 1998 with Credito Italiano to form UniCredit.

== Predecessor ==
=== Monte di Pietà di Verona ===
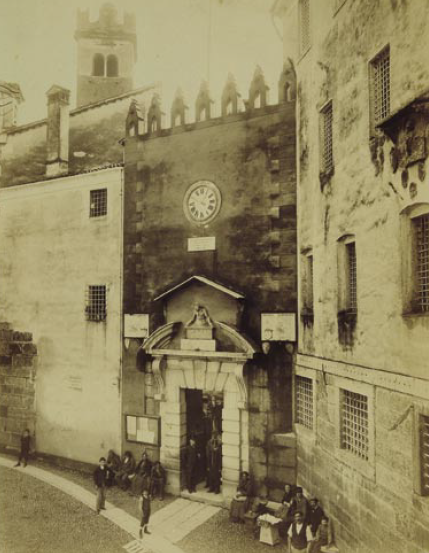
Photo of Piazza Monte, Verona by Moritz Lotze, 1886

Monte di Pietà di Verona is a mount of piety (Italian: monte di pietà) founded in 1490, by the Franciscan Michele da Acqui in the Republic of Venice, 28 years after the first recorded mount of Italy was founded in Perugia, by other Franciscans, Bernardine of Feltre and Michele Carcano, in the Papal States. The mount was later known as Monte di Credito su Pegno di Verona since 1930s. Despite as the founder of the savings bank of Verona, the mount and the bank became separate entities until 1947, which the mount was merged back to the savings bank. The building of the mount located on 1 Piazzetta Monte was used as the headquarters of the banking foundation of the saving bank in from 1993 to 1999.

== History ==
Civica Cassa di Risparmio di Verona was founded in 1825 in Verona in the Kingdom of Lombardy–Venetia of the Austrian Empire as a division of the local mount of piety. In 1892, the bank was independent from the mount of piety. The mount was merged with Cariverona in 1947.

Cassa di Risparmio di Verona merged with other banks in Veneto region in 1927–28, due to a decree-law to consolidate savings banks that were too small. (law no.2587 of 1927) It was renamed to Cassa di Risparmio di Verona e Vicenza in 1927 and Cassa di Risparmio di Verona, Vicenza e Belluno in 1939. Notable entities that were absorbed in 1927–28, were Cassa di Risparmio di Vicenza (founded in 1822), Cassa di Risparmio di Legnago (founded in 1893; merged in 1927), Cassa di Risparmio di Bassano del Grappa (founded in 1912; merged in 1928), Banca del Monte di Feltre, and Cassa di Risparmio di Cologna Veneta, all from the provinces of Verona, Vicenza and Belluno, as well as either mount of piety and/or savings bank origins; Monte di Credito su Pegno di Belluno was absorbed by Cariverona in 1948, followed by the counterpart in Bassano del Grappa in 1955. In 1946, the assets and liabilities of a rural credit union, Cassa Rurale e Artigiana di Isola Rizza, was also acquired by the bank.

Verona, Vicenza and Belluno were the three provincial capitals of Veneto region; in the other 4 provincial capitals, they have separate savings banks, which except Treviso (Cassa di Risparmio della Marca Trivigiana, a predecessor of UniCredit along with Cariverona), were the predecessors of Intesa Sanpaolo (Cassa di Risparmio di Padova e Rovigo and Cassa di Risparmio di Venezia)

In 1989, the bank merged with Cassa di Risparmio di Ancona of Marche region to become Cassa di Risparmio di Verona, Vicenza, Belluno e Ancona. According to La Repubblica, the bank was the fourth largest savings bank (Italian: cassa di risparmio) of Italy at that time. A report by Mediobanca, shown the bank was ranked 20th by total client deposits (Italian: raccolta da clientela; total deposits excluding inter-bank deposit) in 1988, among all type of commercial banks; in terms of savings bank, behind Cassa di Risparmio delle Provincie Lombarde (Cariplo), Cassa di Risparmio di Torino (Banca CRT) and Cassa di Risparmio di Roma. Cariplo was a predecessor of Intesa Sanpaolo banking group (known as Banca Intesa), while Banca CRT later joined Unicredito, which along with Cariverona, was the founding subsidiaries of UniCredito Italiano (now UniCredit) in 1998; Cassa di Risparmio di Roma was a predecessor of Capitalia, which was acquired by UniCredit in 2007.

=== Cariverona Banca S.p.A. ===
In December 1991, due to Legge Amato, the bank was split into two organizations, a società per azioni and a banking foundation (Italian: fondazione). The former continued the banking activities, while the latter inherited the legal person and charity activities.

The bank (now the S.p.A.) and the foundation were the founder of Unicredito banking group as subsidiary and shareholder respectively in 1994. The other member of the group was Cassa di Risparmio della Marca Trivigiana (Cassamarca) and its banking foundation Fondazione Cassamarca.

According to the Bank of Italy figures, in term of market share in deposit (Italian: quote di mercato dei depositi), before the merger of Cariverona (Cassa di Risparmio di Verona, Vicenza, Belluno e Ancona), and Cassamarca, they also had a significant market share in their home province(s). For Cariverona, it was 38.35% in the Province of Verona, 25.23% in Vicenza and 55.11% in Belluno in 1994; the figure in the Province of Ancona was not stated.

In 1996, the business of a minor bank (a former mount of piety), Monte di Credito su Pegno di Vicenza S.p.A. was acquired from its banking foundation Fondazione Monte di Pietà di Vicenza.

According to Italian Competition Authority (AGCM), quoting the figures from the Bank of Italy, Unicredito (presented as Cariverona in Marche region) was one of the major banking group of the Province of Ancona in 1996 (the third after Banca delle Marche and Banca Popolare di Bergamo), in term of market share of deposits (Italian: depositi) of 11%.

In 1997, the bank sold the equity interests (12.6%) in Banco Ambrosiano Veneto to Fondazione Cariplo, the parent company of Cassa di Risparmio delle Provincie Lombarde (Cariplo); in the next year Cariplo and Banco Ambrosiano Veneto merged to form Banca Intesa, a predecessor and one of the major competitor of UniCredit, Intesa Sanpaolo. In the same year Cassa di Risparmio di Torino also joined Unicredito group.

After Unicredito group merged with Credito Italiano in 1998, the foundation still owned 16.532% shares of UniCredit (known as UniCredito Italiano at that time) at 31 December 2001, as the largest shareholder.

On 1 July 2002, Cariverona Banca was merged with other sub-brand and subsidiaries of the banking group to form UniCredit Banca and other divisions of UniCredit.

== Subsidiaries ==
As of 31 December 2001

- Cariverona Ireland (75%)
- Gestiveneto SGR (100%)
- Quercia Software (100%)
- Mediovenezie Banca (former)

== Equity investments ==
As of 31 December 2001

- Autostrada Brescia Verona Vicenza Padova (20.30%)
- Compagnia Investimenti e Sviluppo (4.00%)
- Interporto di Rovigo (2.54%)
- Società per l'Autostrada di Alemagna (8.24%)
- Veneto Sviluppo (10.98%)

former

- Cassa di Risparmio di Udine e Pordenone

== See also ==
- Banca delle Marche, a defunct bank based in Marche region; re-established (bail-out) in 2015, acquired and absorbed by UBI Banca in 2017
  - Cassa di Risparmio di Jesi, a predecessor of Banca delle Marche, based in the Province of Ancona
- Banca Popolare di Ancona, a defunct co-operative bank based in Ancona, Marche, a predecessor of UBI Banca
- Banca Popolare della Provincia di Belluno, a defunct co-operative bank based in Veneto, acquired by Banca Popolare di Vicenza
- Banca Popolare di Verona, a defunct co-operative bank based in Verona, Veneto, a predecessor of Banco Popolare (Banco BPM)
- Banca Popolare di Vicenza, a defunct co-operative bank based in Vicenza, Veneto; being liquidated since 2017; good assets were acquired by Intesa Sanpaolo
- Cardine Banca, a defunct banking group; acquired by Sanpaolo IMI in 2002
  - Casse Venete Banca, a defunct banking group based in Veneto region, a predecessor of Cardine Banca
    - Cassa di Risparmio del Veneto, a subsidiary of Intesa Sanpaolo and founding member of Casse Venete Banca
    - Cassa di Risparmio di Venezia, a former subsidiary of Intesa Sanpaolo and founding member of Casse Venete Banca; converted as branches of Intesa Sanpaolo since 2014
- List of banks in Italy
