= Credito Romagnolo =

Credito Romagnolo, nicknamed Rolo, was an Italian bank based in Bologna, Emilia-Romagna. In 1995 it was acquired by Credito Italiano. In 1996 Credito Romagnolo Group (Credito Romagnolo Holding and Credito Romagnolo S.p.A.) were merged with Group Carimonte Banca to form Rolo Banca.

== History ==
Banca Piccolo Credito Romagnolo was found in 1896. In 1987 the bank acquired Banca Venturi, a bank based in Apulia. In 1992–94 the bank absorbed Banca del Friuli, a bank based in Friuli – Venezia Giulia region. In 1991 Credito Romagnolo had a market share of 11.9% in lending in Emilia-Romagna, while Banca del Friuli had a market share of 8.5% in Friuli – Venezia Giulia. In 1994 the bank acquired Banca Popolare del Molise. The bank also owned Banca Agricola Commerciale (San Marino) at that time.

In 1994 the bank proposed a merger plan to the shareholders of Casse Emiliano Romagnole (CAER), which all shares of CAER would be offer for new shares of Credito Romagnolo. However, it was rejected. CAER's successor was absorbed by Sanpaolo IMI in 2002, which became part of Intesa Sanpaolo in 2007, the archrival of UniCredit, the successor of Credito Italiano.

In 1994 also saw a consortium of Cassa di Risparmio delle Provincie Lombarde (Cariplo, a predecessor of Banca Intesa), Istituto Mobiliare Italiano (IMI, a predecessor of Sanpaolo IMI), Reale Mutua Assicurazioni and CAER made a public offer to buy the shares of Credito Romagnolo, which competing with the offer from Credito Italiano. In 1994 Rolo had a market share of 21.5% in deposits in the province of Bologna, as well as 21.0% in the province of Ravenna .

In 1995 Credito Romagnolo acquired Banca Vincenzo Tamborino, a bank based in Apulia. At the end of 1995, Credito Italiano owned 65% shares of Credito Romagnolo. Credito Italiano organized a merger of Credito Romagnolo with Carimonte Banca effective on 1 January 1996.

== See also ==
- List of banks in Italy
