= Joseph Willett =

American investment banker

Joseph Willett is an American investment banker who served as the chief financial officer (CFO) of investment bank Merrill Lynch & Co. from 1993 to 1998. He would go on to serve as the chief operating officer (COO) Merrill Lynch's European operations from 1998 to 2002, succeeded by Andrea Orcel.

== Early life and education ==
He attended Bates College in Lewiston, Maine graduating in 1973 with degrees in economics and mathematics, cum laude and in Phi Beta Kappa. He went on to attend the University of Rochester for his M.B.A. in 1975.

== Career ==
Willett worked at Chase Manhattan Bank–a firm later absorbed to create JP Morgan Chase–during the 1970s, eventually rising to become a Vice President at the firm. While at Chase, he worked primarily in their financial policy division. He first joined Merrill Lynch & Co. in 1992, working in their New York City offices as director of financial planning. He was appointed the chief financial officer (CFO) of the firm from 1993 to 1998 after which he was asked to serve as the chief operating officer (COO) Merrill Lynch's European operations.

== Personal life ==
Willett lives in Ridgewood, New Jersey with his wife, Janice and three children. On January 18, 2012, he donated $3.5 million to the University of Rochester to fund scholarships and faculty positions.

== See also ==
- List of Bates College people
