= Carimonte Banca =

- Native name: Carimonte Banca S.p.A.
- Company type: Private Società per Azioni
- Industry: Financial services
- Predecessor: Banca del Monte di Bologna e Ravenna; Cassa di Risparmio di Modena
- Founded: 12 July 1991
- Defunct: 31 December 1995
- Successor: Rolo Banca
- Headquarters: 18 viale Aldo Moro, Bologna, Italy
- Services: Retail and corporate banking
- Owner: Carimonte Holding (62.2%); Fondazione Carimodena (11.1%); others (26.7%)
- Parent: Carimonte Holding
- Subsidiaries: Carimonte Fondiario; Banca Popolare di Rieti

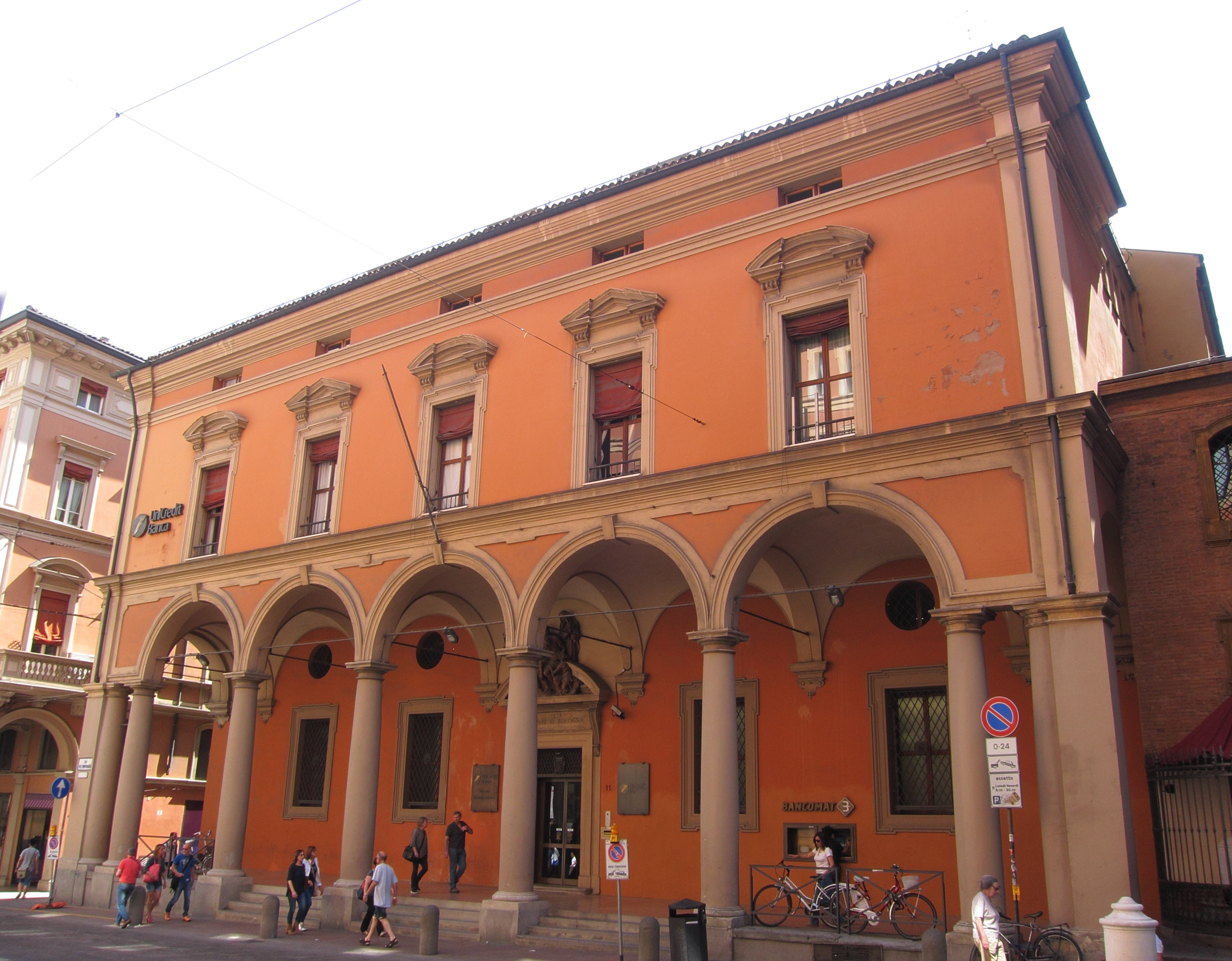
The historic Monte di Pietà in Bologna

Carimonte Banca was an Italian bank based in Bologna, Emilia–Romagna region. The bank was formed on 12 July 1991 (gazetted on 21 August) by the merger of Banca del Monte di Bologna e Ravenna and Cassa di Risparmio di Modena. On 31 December 1995 was merged with Credito Romagnolo (a subsidiary of Credito Italiano) to form Rolo Banca.

In 1995 the bank also acquired a minority interests in Banca Popolare di Rieti.

== History ==
The predecessor of the bank could be traced back to Mount of Piety of Bologna, found 1473, which was merged with Mount of Piety of Ravenna (found 1492) to form Banca del Monte di Bologna e Ravenna in 1966. In 1991 Carimonte Banca was formed by the merger of the Banca Monte and Cassa di Risparmio di Modena (found 1846). The holding company of the bank was Carimonte Holding, a joint venture of Fondazione Carimodena and Fondazione del Monte di Bologna e Ravenna in 50–50 voting rights and 60–40 share capitals.

== Sponsorship ==
The bank was a sponsor of Modena Volley.

== See also ==
- List of banks in Italy
