= UniCredit Banca =

Retail banking division of UniCredit Group

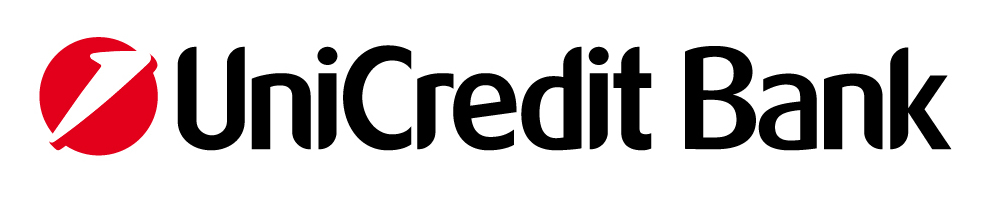
- Type: Subsidiary
- Industry: Financial services
- Predecessor: 7 retail subsidiaries of UniCredit
- Founded: 1 July 2002
- Founder: UniCredit
- Defunct: 2010
- Fate: absorbed by UniCredit
- Successor: retail division of UniCredit
- Headquarters: Palazzo Magnani, Bologna, Italy
- Number of locations: 2346 (2009)
- Area served: Northern Italy
- Services: retail banking
- Net income: ▲€81.851 million (2009)
- Total assets: ▲€77.252 billion (2009)
- Total equity: ▲€1.811 billion (2009)
- Owner: UniCredit (100%)
- Parent: UniCredit
- Capital ratio: 9.80% (Basel II Tier 1)

UniCredit Banca S.p.A. was the retail banking division of UniCredit Group. On 1 July 2002, Rolo Banca, Banca CRT, Cariverona Banca, Cassamarca, Cassa di Risparmio di Trento e Rovereto and Cassa di Risparmio di Trieste were merged into Credito Italiano S.p.A. (a new subsidiary of UniCredit incorporated in December 1999), with Credito Italiano was renamed into UniCredit Banca S.p.A.. On 1 January 2003 UniCredit Private Banking and UniCredit Banca d'Impresa were spin off from UniCredit Banca

After UniCredit acquired Capitalia Group in an all-share deal in 2007, UniCredit Group gained the brand Banca di Roma and Banco di Sicilia. UniCredit Banca exchanged branches with the two sister companies (as well as absorbing Bipop Carire), making UniCredit Banca was specialized in the northern Italy. 3 branches of former UniCredit Banca were sold to fellow Italian bank Banca Carige.

In 2010, UniCredit Banca was absorbed by the parent company UniCredit S.p.A., becoming the retail division of the company.

== See also ==
- List of banks in Italy
