= Dino De Poli =

Italian politician (1929–2020)

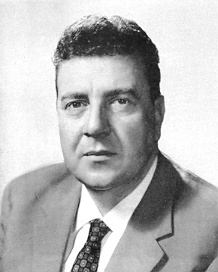
Dino De Poli

Dino De Poli (24 August 1929 – 22 July 2020) was an Italian lawyer and politician.

De Poli was born in Treviso on 24 August 1929. He studied and practiced law. De Poli was elected to a single term as a member of the Chamber of Deputies in 1968, representing Christian Democracy. He later served as founding leader of the Cassamarca Foundation from 1992 to 2018. De Poli died on 22 July 2020, aged 90.
