= Credito Italiano =

Former Italian bank

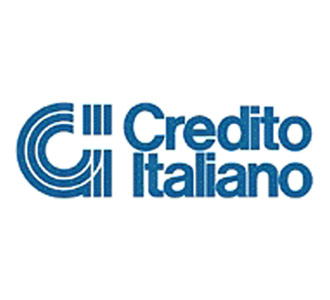

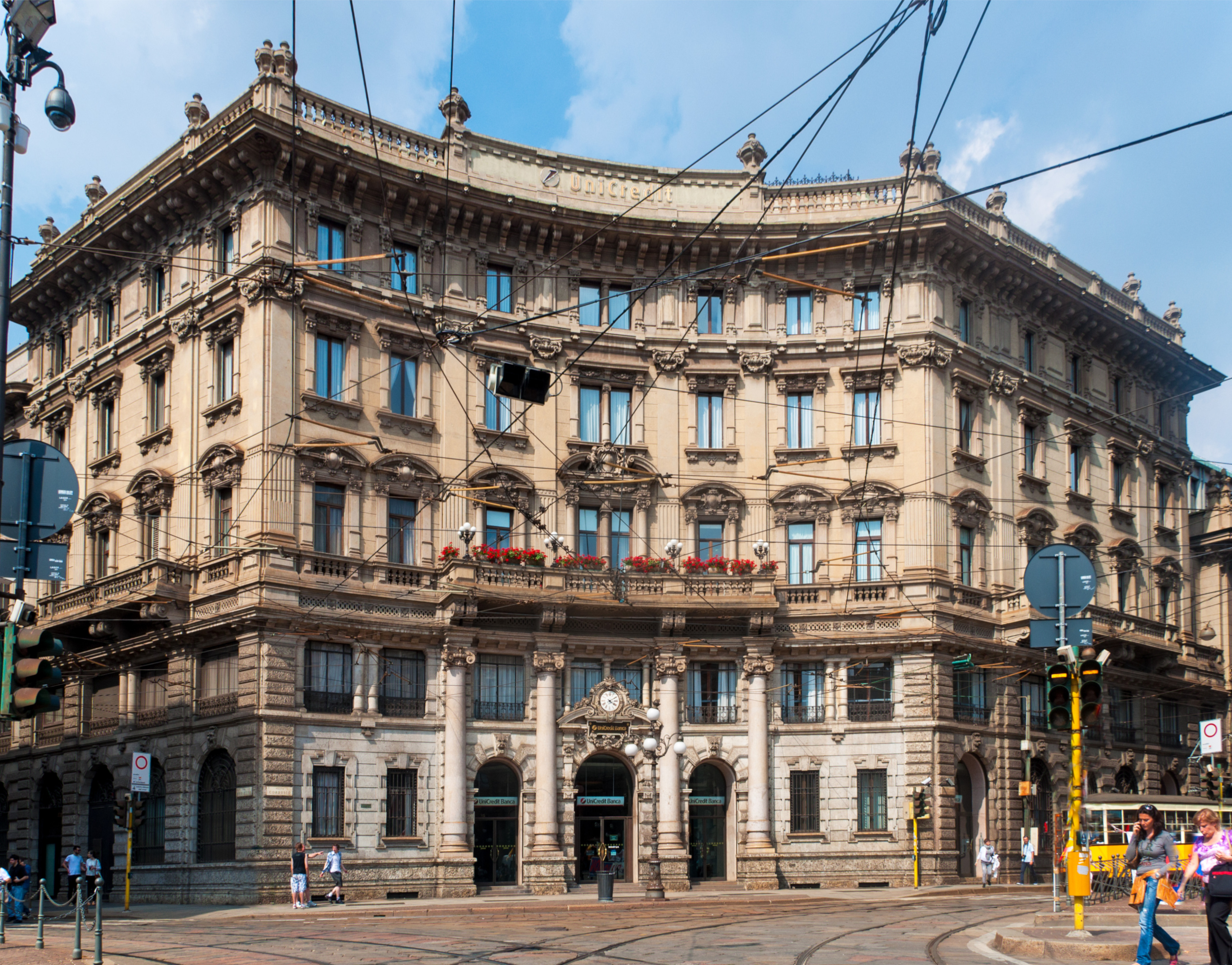
- Building on Piazza Cordusio in Milan, head office of Credit from 1901 to 1998
- Native name: Credito Italiano S.p.A.
- Formerly: Banca di Genova
- Company type: subsidiary
- Industry: Financial services
- Founded: 1870 in Genoa; December 1999 in Milan
- Defunct: 1998 (merger); 30 June 2002
- Successor: UniCredit Banca; UniCredit Private Banking; UniCredit Banca d'Impresa
- Headquarters: 1 via Dante, Genoa, Italy (in register); Piazza Cordusio, Milan, Italy (de facto); 16 Via Broletto, Milan, Italy (2000–02)
- Owner: UniCredito Italiano (100%)
- Parent: UniCredito Italiano
- Subsidiaries: Adalya Banca Immobiliare
- Website: www.credit.it

Credito Italiano, often referred to by the shorthand Credit, was a significant Italian bank based in Milan. It was established in 1895, succeeding the Banca di Genova established in 1870 in Genoa. In 1998 it merged with Unicredito to form Unicredito Italiano, later known as UniCredit.

Soon afterwards, UniCredit created a new subsidiary of the same name to run the retail network of Credito Italiano. On 1 July 2002, that subsidiary received the assets of sister banks to become UniCredit Banca.

== Bank of Genoa and establishment of Credito Italiano ==
The Banca di Genova was founded on 28 April 1870, with an initial capital of 3 million lire. Its shareholders included local nobility (Pallavicino and Balbi), bankers (Quartara, Polleri) and merchants (Lagorio, Dodero, Bacigalupo). In 1872, it opened the first trans-Atlantic banking business with Buenos Aires.

In 1895, in the aftermath of a major financial crisis in Italy, the Bank of Genoa was reorganized with support from Italian and foreign (French, German and Swiss) financiers, including the banks Manzi & Co. (Rome) and Kuster & Co. (Turin). Under the leadership of Giacomo Castelbolognesi, a partner at the Banca Manzi, it was combined with Milan-based Banca Vonwiller and renamed as Credito Italiano, headquartered in Milan with a paid-in capital of 14 million lire.

== 20th-century development ==
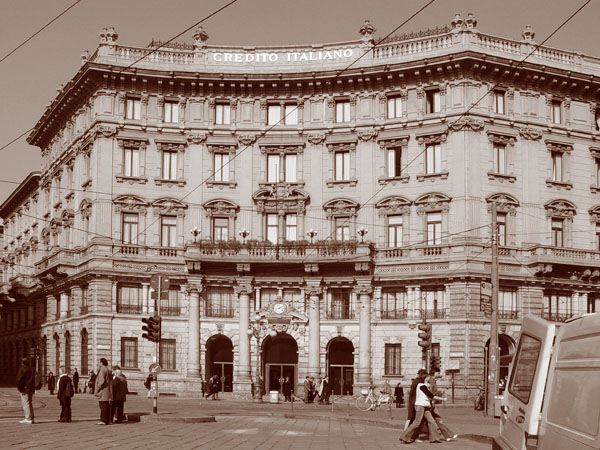
Photograph of the Milan building featuring the Credito Italiano brand

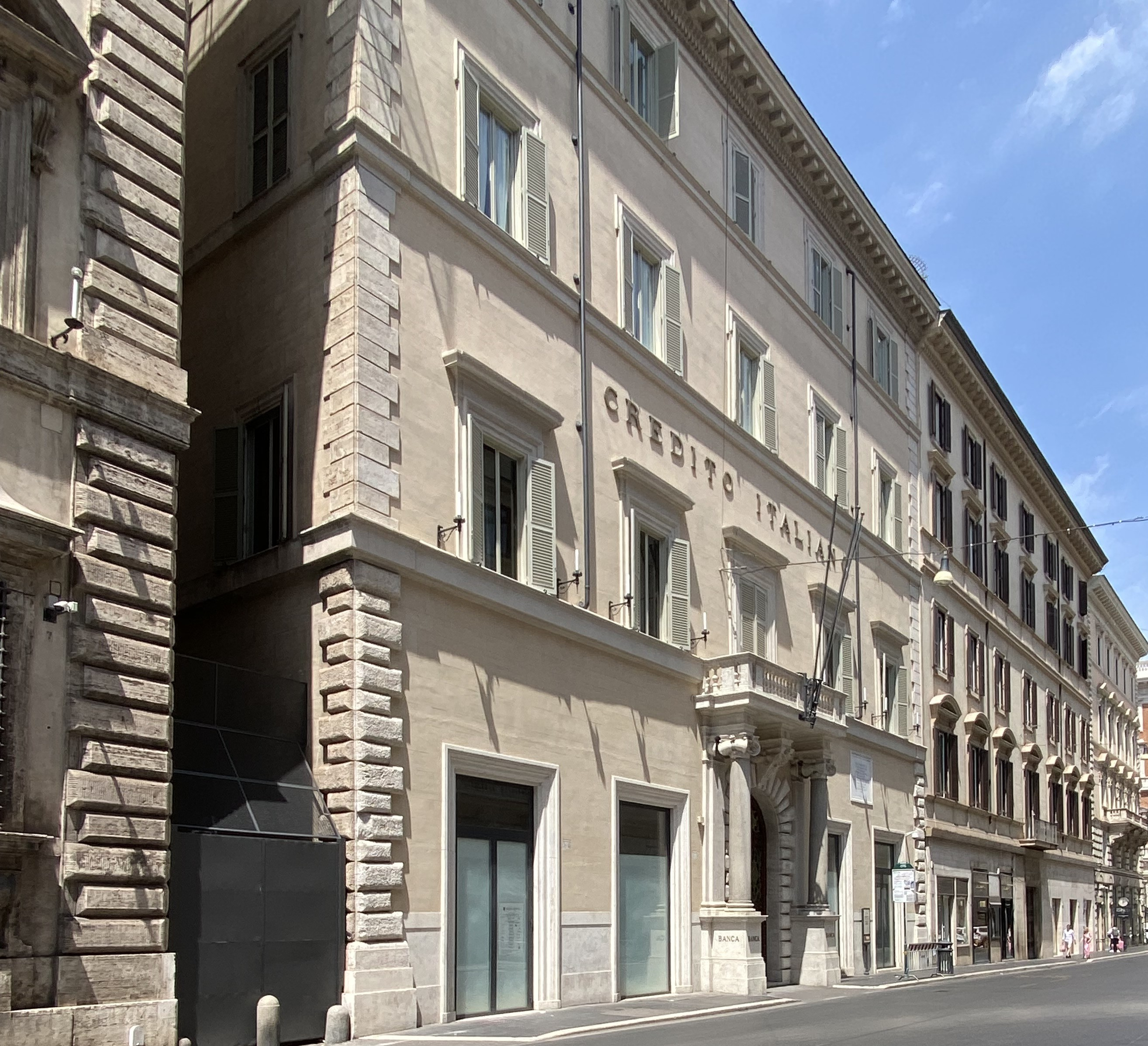
Former Credito Italiano building in Rome, Via del Corso 374

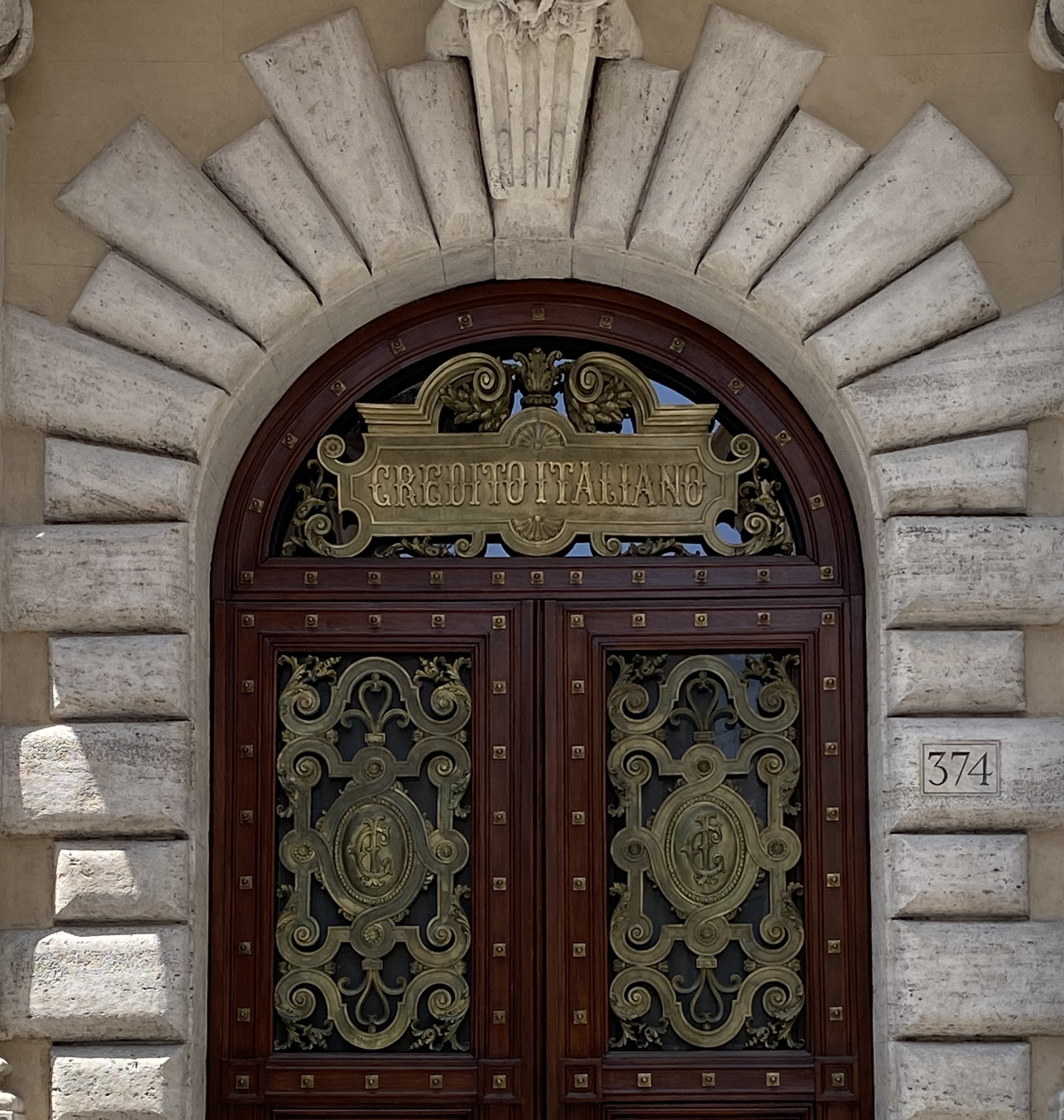
Detail of entrance of the Rome building

In 1901, Credit in turn acquired the Banca Manzi, and in 1905 the Banca Meuricoffre in Naples. Its headquarters moved to Piazza Cordusio, and it opened a branch office in London in 1911. By 1913 its equity capital reached 75 million lire, and its savings and demand deposits grew very rapidly. It became a major source of funding for Italian industry in the prosperous years 1896-1913, especially iron and steel, electric power, sugar-beet refining, urban transportation, and chemicals.

At the start of the First World War, the executive directors of Credito Italiano and of Banca Commerciale Italiana, the other dominant Italian universal bank which had also benefited from the support of German financiers, were officially in favour of neutrality. However these banks were the subject of a campaign by both Italian nationalists, spearheaded by L'Idea Nazionale and Liberals grouped around Francesco Saverio Nitti. Both these political initiatives had links with business rivals Gio. Ansaldo & C. and Banca Italiana di Sconto.

Following World War I, Credito Italiano acquired the "Banca del Monferrato", "Banca di Legnano", "Credito Varesino and the Swiss Banca Unione di Credito (1919), and in 1920 it joined the "Compagnia Finanziaria Nazionale" (1920); and established "Banca Italo-cinese", the "Banca Italo Viennese" and "Tiroler Hauptbank" (1920). In 1921 it opened offices in Paris and Berlin and later contributed to the establishments of Banca Italo Egiziana (1924) and National Bank of Albania (1925).It was highly profitable in the boom years 1922 – 1925, thanks to the success of Italian industry. Decline set in after 1925.

As a result of the great depression, it went bankrupt and was nationalized, but became active again with funding from Istituto per la Ricostruzione Industriale (1933–1990s).

Italian government introduced a law that forced bank to separate short term loan and medium loan business in 1936. Credito Italiano, along with two other "bank of national interests", BCI and Banco di Roma, had formed Mediobanca in 1946.

From 1973, until it was divested to Credito Emiliano in 1995, Banca Creditwest e dei Comuni Vesuviani (formerly Banca Milanese di Credito) was majority owned by Credito Italiano with National Westminster Bank as a minority shareholder. It had around 30 branches in Rome, Milan and Naples.

In the 1990s the bank became a private company, as Italian government sold the stake of the bank. The bank also acquired Banca Popolare di Spoleto (about 50%) in 1992 and Banca Cattolica di Molfetta (35%) in 1994.

In 1995 the bank acquired a majority interests in Credito Romagnolo (and its subsidiary Banca Popolare del Molise) and Carimonte Banca (and its subsidiary Banca Popolare di Rieti), which was merged into Rolo Banca, except Banca Popolare di Rieti was spin off from Carimonte.

== Transformation into UniCredito Italiano and UniCredit Banca ==
In late 1998 Credito Italiano was merged with Unicredito, which Unicredito was absorbed into Credito Italiano, and Credito Italiano was renamed into UniCredito Italiano. The original shareholders of Unicredito would owned about 38.46% shares of UniCredito Italiano.

In the same year Banca Popolare di Spoleto (July), Banca Cattolica di Molfetta (October) were sold, as well as Banca Popolare del Molise and Banca Popolare di Rieti were merged into Rolo Banca and UniCredit in June 1998 and 1999. In December 1999, Credito Italiano was reestablished as a subsidiary (instead of a division within the company).

On 1 July 2002, Credito Italiano, as a subsidiary, was renamed to UniCredit Banca, which received the retail bank assets from Rolo Banca, Banca CRT, Cariverona Banca, Cassamarca, Cassa di Risparmio di Trento e Rovereto and Cassa di Risparmio di Trieste. On 1 January 2003 UniCredit Private Banking and UniCredit Banca d'Impresa were spin off from UniCredit Banca. In 2010 the bank was completely absorbed into UniCredit.

== See also ==
- Banco di Chiavari e della Riviera Ligure
- Banca Carige
- List of banks in Italy
