= UniCredit Bank Slovenia =

- Native name: UniCredit Banka Slovenija d.d.
- Formerly: Bank Austria Creditanstalt d.d. Ljubljana
- Type: Subsidiary, delniška družba
- Industry: Financial services
- Founded: 24 January 1991 (as d.d.)
- Headquarters: 140 Šmartinska, Ljubljana, Slovenia
- Number of locations: 28 branches (2015)
- Key people: Martin Klauzer (Chairman of the Supervisory Board); Stefan Vavti (Chairman of the Management Board)
- Services: Retail, corporate & investment banking; finance leasing
- Net income: ▲8.721 million (2015)
- Total assets: ▲€2.630 billion (December 2015)
- Total equity: ▲€270.371 million (December 2015)
- Owner: UniCredit S.p.A. (99.99%)
- Number of employees: ▲600 (December 2015)
- Subsidiaries: UniCredit Leasing d.o.o. (100%)
- Capital ratio: ▲19.51% (Group CET1 Capital ratio)
- Footnotes in a consolidated basis

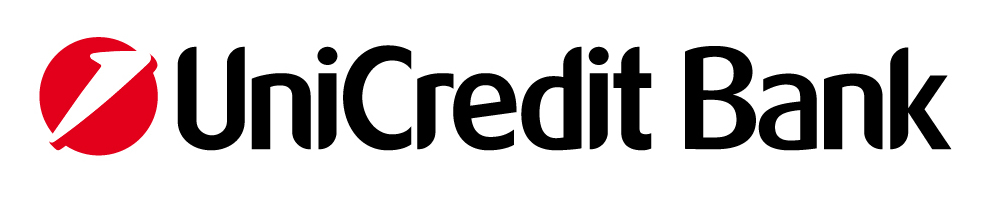
UniCredit Bank logo

UniCredit Bank Slovenia (Slovene: UniCredit Banka Slovenija) is a Slovenian bank, which was a subsidiary of Italy-based UniCredit Group. According to the bank, UniCredit Bank Slovenia had a market share of 7.6% in Slovenia, in terms of total loans as of 30 September 2015.

Bank Austria was the intermediate parent company of UniCredit Bank Slovenia, which UniCredit Group acquired Bank Austria's parent company HypoVereinsbank in 2005 (in turn acquired Bank Austria and Bank Austria Creditanstalt d.d. Ljubljana). In September 2016, UniCredit Group eliminated the intermediates by holding the stake directly by UniCredit S.p.A.

On 21 December 2016, lesser than a month that the ultimate parent company UniCredit Group sold €17.7 billion bad loan portfolios (in gross book value) to institutional investors, UniCredit Bank Slovenia also sold approx. €110 million non performing credit portfolio to B2 Kapital without recourse. As at 31 December 2015, UniCredit Bank Slovenia, together with its subsidiary, had €183.359 million loans that were classified as bad loan.
