= Cassa di Risparmio di Perugia =

Italian savings bank

Banca dell'Umbria 1462
- Formerly: Cassa di Risparmio di Perugia; Cassa di Risparmio di Perugia S.p.A.
- Company type: Statutory corporation (until 1992); Subsidiary (1992–2005)
- Industry: Financial services
- Founded: 1908; 1992 (as S.p.A.); 1999 (rename)
- Defunct: 2005
- Fate: became branches of UniCredit
- Successor: C.R. Perugia Foundation; branches of UniCredit
- Headquarters: Perugia, Umbria, Italy
- Services: Retail banking; corporate banking
- Owner: C.R. Perugia Foundation (1992–1999); Rolo Banca (1999–2002); UniCredit (2002–2005)
- Parent: UniCredit (1999–2005)
- Website: www.bancaumbria.it

Banca dell'Umbria 1462 S.p.A. or previously known as Cassa di Risparmio di Perugia was an Italian savings bank. The bank became a subsidiary of UniCredit in 1999 and ceased to exist in 2005. However, its former owner Fondazione Cassa di Risparmio di Perugia, still operated as a charity organization. The foundation and the S.p.A. were split in 1992 from the original statutory corporation of the bank due to Legge Amato.

== History ==
=== Predecessor ===
The history of the bank could traced back to 1462, which mount of piety of Perugia (Italian: Monte di Pietà di Perugia) was founded by Franciscans Fortunato Coppoli and Barnaba Manassei da Terni, such as Bernardine of Feltre and Michele Carcano in other cities. The mount was considered as the first mount in Italy. In 1972 the Monte was merged with Cassa di Risparmio di Perugia. (The savings bank of Perugia)

=== Cassa di Risparmio di Perugia ===
Cassa di Risparmio di Perugia was founded in 1908.

=== Cassa di Risparmio di Perugia S.p.A. / Banca dell'Umbria 1462 S.p.A. ===
In 1992, due to Legge Amato, the bank non-profit making ownership as well as charity work were separated from daily banking operation, thus the formation of Cassa di Risparmio di Perugia S.p.A. and a banking foundation Fondazione Cassa di Risparmio di Perugia. The bank was renamed to Banca dell'Umbria 1462 S.p.A. In 1999.

In 1999 the owner of Cassa di Risparmio di Perugia (Banca dell'Umbria): the banking foundation sold the majority interests to Rolo Banca, an associate company of UniCredit, for the shares of Rolo Banca. The foundation still held 25.22% shares of Banca dell'Umbria directly and a tiny interests through minority share holding of Rolo Banca for just 3%. In 2001, Mediocredito dell'Umbria, a subsidiary of Banca dell'Umbria, was absorbed into Banca dell'Umbria. In 2003 the banking foundation reduced the shares of Banca dell'Umbria it owned to 3.5% directly and a very tiny interests indirectly through its 0.88% shares of UniCredit.

In 2005 Banca dell'Umbria was absorbed into UniCredit.

== Banking foundation ==
A successor of the bank, Fondazione Cassa di Risparmio di Perugia, is a local charity organization of Perugia area. The foundation funded the University for Foreigners Perugia to employ of Vittorio Sgarbi in 2017. However, the labour contract was voided soon later.

The foundation was known for employed Carlo Colaiacovo as chairman for a wage of 1.7 billion lire, which was credited as one of the 20 uomini d'oro (literally "golden men") of Italian public companies in 1998.

In 2005, the foundation founded a museum for its art collection in an ancient building Palazzo Baldeschi. Notable collection of the foundation included Madonna col Bambino e paesaggio by Pinturicchio.

== See also ==
- Art collection of Fondazione Cassa di Risparmio di Perugia
- List of banks in Italy
