= UniCredit =

International banking group

UniCredit S.p.A.

- Unicredit Tower, the company's headquarters in Porta Nuova, Milan
- Formerly: UniCredito Italiano S.p.A.
- Type: Public
- Traded as: BIT: UCG; FWB: CRI; WSE: UCG; FTSE MIB component; EURO STOXX 50 component
- ISIN: IT0005239360
- Industry: Financial services
- Predecessor: UniCredito; Credito Italiano; Capitalia
- Founded: 1998; 28 years ago
- Headquarters: Unicredit Tower, Milan, Italy
- Key people: Pier Carlo Padoan (chairman); Andrea Orcel (CEO)
- Products: Retail and private banking; Corporate and investment banking; Finance leasing; Factoring; Insurance (via joint venture)
- Revenue: ▲€24.844 billion (2024)
- Operating income: ▲€15.439 billion (2024)
- Net income: ▲€9.719 billion (2024)
- Total assets: €902,165 billion (Q1 2026)
- Total equity: ▲€64.4 billion (2024)
- Number of employees: ▼69,722 (2024)
- Capital ratio: ▲13,86% (Group CET1, end 2024)
- Website: www.unicreditgroup.eu

UniCredit S.p.A. (formerly UniCredito Italiano S.p.A.) is an Italian multinational banking group headquartered in Milan. It is one of the largest banking groups in Italy, alongside Intesa Sanpaolo. As of 2025, it was the world's 44th-largest bank by total assets.

The group was formed in 1998 through the merger of Credito Italiano and Unicredito. It traces its origins to Banca di Genova, founded in 1870. UniCredit is listed on the Borsa Italiana and the Frankfurt Stock Exchange, and is a constituent of the Euro Stoxx 50.

UniCredit operates in Italy, Germany through HypoVereinsbank, Austria through Bank Austria, several countries in Central and Southeastern Europe, and Russia.

== History ==
=== Founding through mergers and growth (1998–2006) ===
UniCredit was the outcome of the 1998 merger of several Italian banking groups, which the majority one were Unicredito (banks from Turin, Verona and Treviso) and Credito Italiano (consists of Rolo Banca, Banca Popolare di Rieti), hence the name UniCredito Italiano. Credito Italiano issued about 38.46% new shares to the owners of Unicredito, and renamed itself to Unicredito Italiano. Other banks such as Banca dell'Umbria, Cassa di Risparmio di Carpi, Cassa di Risparmio di Trento e Rovereto (Caritro), Cassa di Risparmio di Trieste also joined the group in 1998–2000. A new subsidiary was also created in December 1999 which was named after the original Credito Italiano.

In 1999, UniCredito Italiano, as it was then known, began its expansion in Eastern Europe with the acquisition of Polish company Bank Pekao. On 30 June 2002, UniCredit started its S3 project which merged 7 of their bank network: Rolo Banca, Banca CRT, Cariverona Banca, Cassamarca, Cassa di Risparmio di Trento e Rovereto and Cassa di Risparmio di Trieste into Credito Italiano, and Credito Italiano was renamed into UniCredit Banca. UniCredit Private Banking and UniCredit Banca d'Impresa was spin off from it in 2003.

In 2005, UniCredit merged with the German group HypoVereinsbank (HVB), which is itself formed in 1998 by the combination of two Bavarian banks: Bayerische Vereinsbank and Bayerische Hypotheken-und Wechsel-Bank. Integration with the HVB Group was reinforced by the merger with Bank Austria Creditanstalt in the year 2000 and enabled further growth for the UniCredit Group. Additionally, Bank Austria Creditanstalt was a major shareholder in Bank Medici AG. Bank Medici was Thema Fund's investment manager. In return for finding investors, Bank Medici collected fees of 4.6 million euros from Thema International Fund in 2007. Following the news that Bank Medici had invested US$2 billion with Bernard Madoff, officials in Vienna appointed a supervisor to run the private bank, raising questions about control of the sprawling group.

On 30 June 2005 (effective on July 1, 2025) Banca dell'Umbria and Cassa di Risparmio di Carpi were absorbed into the parent company. In 2006 the securities services business of UniCredit (2S Banca, now Société Générale Security Services S.p.A.) was sold to Société Générale for €579.3 million. In 2006, minority interests in the savings banks of Bra (31.021%), Fossano (23.077%), Saluzzo (31.019%) and Savigliano (31.006%) were sold for about €149 million to Banca Popolare dell'Emilia Romagna.

=== Acquisition of Capitalia, 2008 financial crisis, and its consequences (2007–2017) ===
In 2007, in combination with the Capitalia Group, the fourth-largest Italian banking group (by total assets in 2006; Sanpaolo IMI and Banca Intesa were counted as one entity as the banks also merged in 2007). The registered office of the bank was also relocated from Genoa (inherited from Credito Italiano) to 17 via Minghetti, Rome.

In the same year, two more acquisitions were carried out: ATF Bank, which ranks fifth out of domestic banks in Kazakhstan with 154 branches, and Ukrsotsbank, a universal bank in Ukraine. With these two banks, the Group extended its operations in this area to 19 countries (including Central Asia). However, in November 2012, Kazakh government sources declared UniCredit is in talks with Kazakh investors over the sale of a controlling stake in ATF Bank.

In 2010, UniCredit S.p.A. absorbed its Italian banking subsidiaries: UniCredit Banca, Banca di Roma and Banco di Sicilia. In 2013 UniCredit Finance reported that they would no longer provide banking services in Latvia. On March 14, 2014, UniCredit announced that it expected to cut around 8,500 jobs in the future, together with the announcement of a $15 billion loss in the 4th quarter of 2013 due to extensive cash-reserving for bad loans and writing down goodwill from acquisitions. UniCredit is one of the 6 European banks which are currently most exposed to potential problems in the emerging markets.

In April 2015 UniCredit and Banco Santander reached a preliminary agreement to merge their asset-management businesses in a transaction valuing the combined entity at about €5.4 billion. However, the deal was terminated on 27 July 2016. Nevertheless, Pioneer was sold in December 2016 to Amundi for €3.545 billion. UniCredit also received an extraordinary dividend of €315 million from Pioneer.

From June 2015 to January 2017 UniCredit sold its NPLs that was doubtful to collect (sofferenze) to various investors, namely PRA Group Europe (€625 million gross), a fund managed by Cerberus Capital Management (€100 million gross), a US fund (€150 million gross), AnaCap Financial Partners (€420 million gross), Fortress Investment Group and PIMCO (€17.7 billion gross; UniCredit retained a minority stake in the securitization SPV), B2 Kapital (€110 million in gross from Slovenian subsidiary) and B2Holding (€93 million from UniCredit Bulbank). In October 2015, UniCredit also sold UniCredit Credit Management Bank (now doBank), the subsidiary that specialized in managing NPLs to Fortress Investment Group and Prelios S.p.A. A portfolio of €2.4 billion (in gross book value) NPLs was included in the deal. On a year to year basis, the net value of sofferenze had increased from €19.701 billion on 31 December 2014 to €19.924 billion on 31 December 2015 (or from €52.143 billion to €51.089 billion in gross).

In December 2016 UniCredit sold Polish bank Bank Pekao. UniCredit had already sold part of the stake in FinecoBank in mid 2016, as well as sold Ukrainian bank Ukrsotsbank to Alfa Group in January 2016. In December 2016, the card business in Italy, Germany and Austria was sold to SIA for €500 million.

On 13 December 2016, despite the annual European Central Bank (ECB) Supervisory Review and Evaluation Process (SREP) lowed the CET1 ratio (transitional basis) requirement of UniCredit from 9.75% to 8.75%, the bank announced a massive €13 billion recapitalization of the bank, as well as €8.1 billion loan loss provisions and net restructuring charges of €1.7 billion in the fourth quarter of 2016. In the 2016 European Union bank stress test announced on 29 July, UniCredit's CET1 ratio (fully loaded basis) was predicted at 7.10% in the adverse scenario on 31 December 2018, which was the second last among the big 5 Italian banks that participated in the stress test (the last was Banca Monte dei Paschi di Siena). Based on the 2016 SREP, UniCredit Group has required a fully load basis CET1 ratio of 10.5% from 1 January 2019 due to an increase in Capital Conservation Buffer and global systemically important bank buffer as required by CRR and CRD IV. Moreover, the pillar 2 guidance: the additional capital that ECB suggested the bank to keep, was remained confidential.

In January 2017 10 old ordinary shares were combined into 1 new ordinary share, as well as bearer savings share and registered savings share. On April 6, 2017, UniCredit issued its first bond in the United States in a decade. In mid-2017, a capital increase was completed as well as securitization and partial disposal of the NPLs of the bank. In December 2017, the savings share (Italian: azioni di risparmio) of the bank was converted to the ordinary share, as well as the removal of the 5% cap on voting rights for each entity.

=== Expansion with a new round of acquisitions (2023-25) ===
In October 2023, UniCredit announced that it would become the largest investor in Alpha Bank, buying a 9% stake in the Greek bank and taking over its Romanian subsidiary.

On 11 September 2024, UniCredit announced that it had purchased a 9% stake in Commerzbank. Half of the stake was bought on the open market; the other half was bought from the German government, which sold a part of the stake it owns since the 2008 financial crisis and bailout of Commerzbank. UniCredit also announced that it has asked for the ECB regulatory approval to raise its stake in Commerzbank beyond 9,9% in a move widely understood as the first step of a potential takeover of Germany’s second-largest private-sector bank by UniCredit. On 23 September 2024, UniCredit stated that it increased its stake in Commerzbank to 21% (even though the new acquisition of a 11,5% stake in Commerzbank need an ECB approval to be settled) and has submitted a request to the ECB to increase its stake to 12,9%. On December 18, 2024, Unicredit increased its stake in Commerzbank to 28%. The German government called the move uncoordinated and hostile. On 25 November 2024, UniCredit launched a €10.1bn takeover bid for Banco BPM.

On 2 February 2025, UniCredit owned 4.1% of Generali. On 9 March 2025, UniCredit closed a deal to acquire Belgium-based digital bank Aion Bank, as well as Vodeno, Aion's cloud-native core banking system, for €376 million. In October 2025, UniCredit discarded the brand 'Aion Bank' and renamed its activies as 'UniCredit Belgium' and 'UniCredit Poland'. On 14 March 2025, the ECB gave its regulatory approval to UniCredit for the increase of its stake in Commerzbank to up to 29.9% and, a month later, the Federal Cartel Office (Germany's antitrust authority) also approved UniCredit's plan to raise its stake in Commerzbank to 29.9%. In July 2025, UniCredit announced that it had increased its stake in Commerzbank to 20%. On April 3, 2025, UniCredit is expected to receive conditional approval from the government for its €14 billion all-share takeover bid for smaller rival Banco BPM. The government is reviewing the deal under its "golden powers," which enables it to set conditions on takeovers in strategic sectors. While the conditions are still unspecified, they are not expected to pose significant obstacles. The review should conclude by the end of April, but UniCredit has until June 30 to consider their options and decide whether to proceed with the offer. On April 11, 2025, UniCredit joined a European Banking Federation task force to support defense and security investments. Led by CEO Andrea Orcel, the move strengthens the bank's role in financing Europe’s strategic autonomy amid rising geopolitical tensions. In May 2025, UniCredit announced a 10-year partnership with Google Cloud aimed at modernizing the bank's IT infrastructure and supporting its digital transformation strategy. At the end of May 2025, UniCredit increased its stake in Alpha Bank from 9.7% to 20% and further increased its stake to 26% in August 2025. In January 2026, UniCredit converted its synthetic stake in Alpha Bank Stake into a direct holding of 29.8% of Alpha Bank's capital.

On 16 March 2026, UniCredit officially launched a €35bn takeover bid on Commerzbank, which consists in a voluntary exchange offer valuing Commerzbank at around €35bn and with the stated aim of increasing its stake in the German lender beyond the 30% threshold. The takeover bid resulted in UniCredit increasing its take in Commerzbank to 47.6% by July 2026.

On October 15, 2026, UniCredit said European Central Bank had given it permission to increase its stake in Commerzbank beyond 30%, with no limit on how much it could own. The bank said it expected to take control of Commerzbank by the end of the year.

== buddybank ==
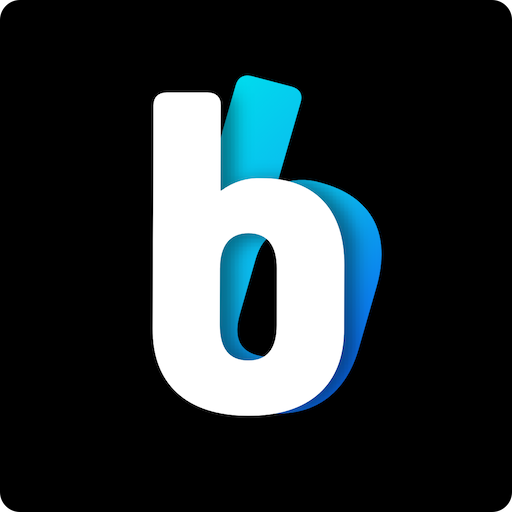
buddybank logo

On 29 January 2018 buddybank was launched on the Italian market. buddybank is the first mobile-only bank designed for iOS devices, but is also developed on Android: the official app of the service is available on Android smartphones, iPhone, iPad and iPod Touch devices. buddybank is based on a conversational operating model: customers can communicate with the bank through a chat system and receive assistance 24 hours a day, 7 days a week.

== Geography ==
The company has its registered office and general management in Milan. The registered office was located in Rome from the date of the merger with Capitalia in 2007, and relocated back to Milan in 2017. The registered office was located in Genoa from 1999 to 2007. UniCredit's core markets are Italy, Germany, Austria, Bosnia and Herzegovina, Bulgaria, Croatia, the Czech Republic, Hungary, Serbia, Slovakia, Slovenia, Romania, and Russia.

UniCredit Corporate & Investment banking division serves 1,500 multinational corporates and key financial institutions and supports the group's corporate banking units in delivering services to 600,000 corporate and public sector clients. Its International Network spreads over 16 countries worldwide and provides access to a network of 4,000 correspondent banking relationships, covering 175 countries. CIB international centers are present in New York City, London, Hong Kong, Singapore, Tokyo, Shanghai, Milan, Munich, Vienna, Budapest, Prague, Madrid, Beijing, Mumbai, Athens, Seoul, Zurich, Hanoi, Abu Dhabi.

With the goal of fostering trade and investment between Eastern and Western Europe, UniCredit has joined up with Ost-Ausschuss der Deutschen Wirtschaft and the Federal State of Berlin to host the east forum Berlin.

UniCredit Tower in Milan

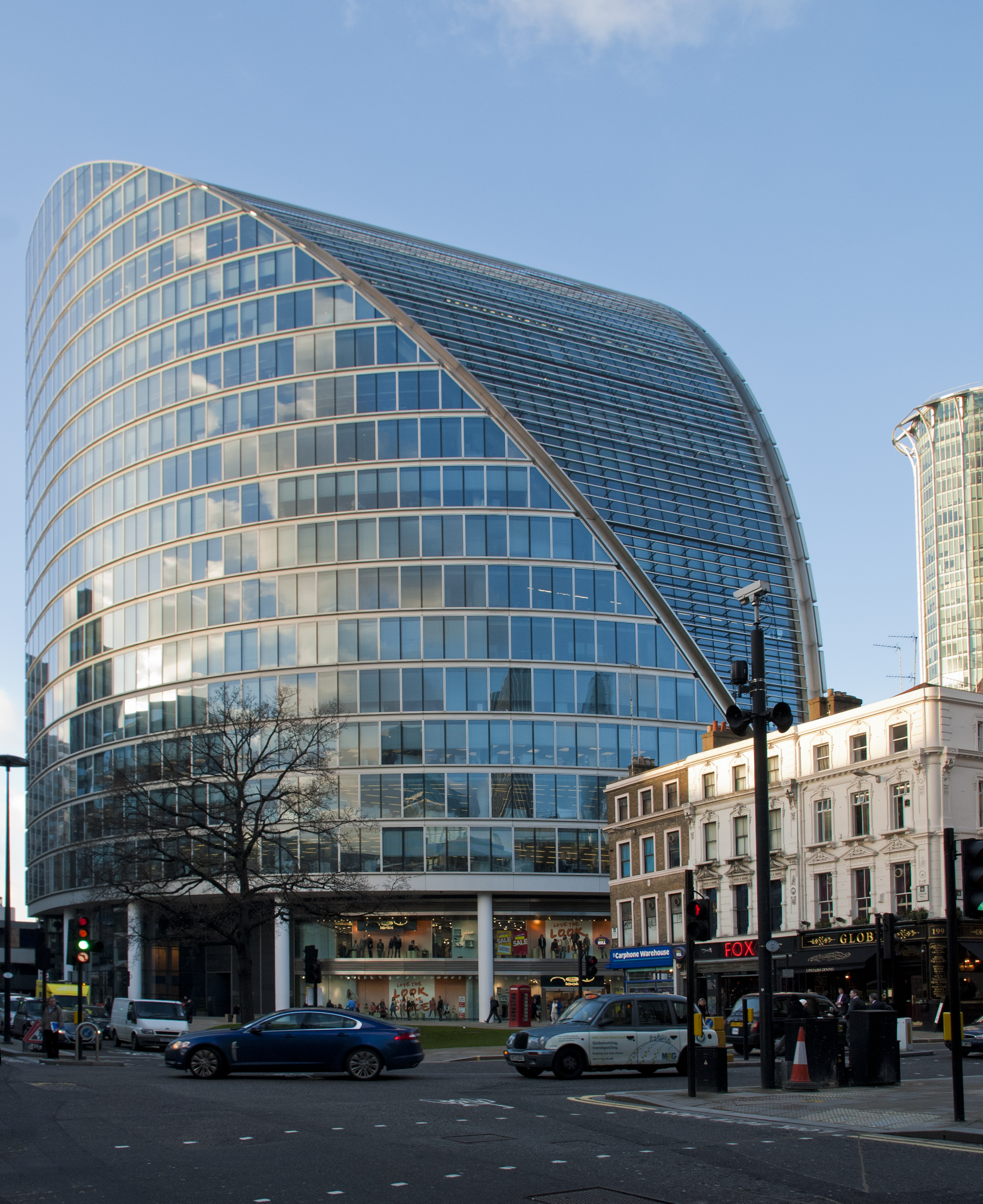
UniCredit Head Office in Moor House in the City of London, United Kingdom

UniCredit in Vilnius, Lithuania

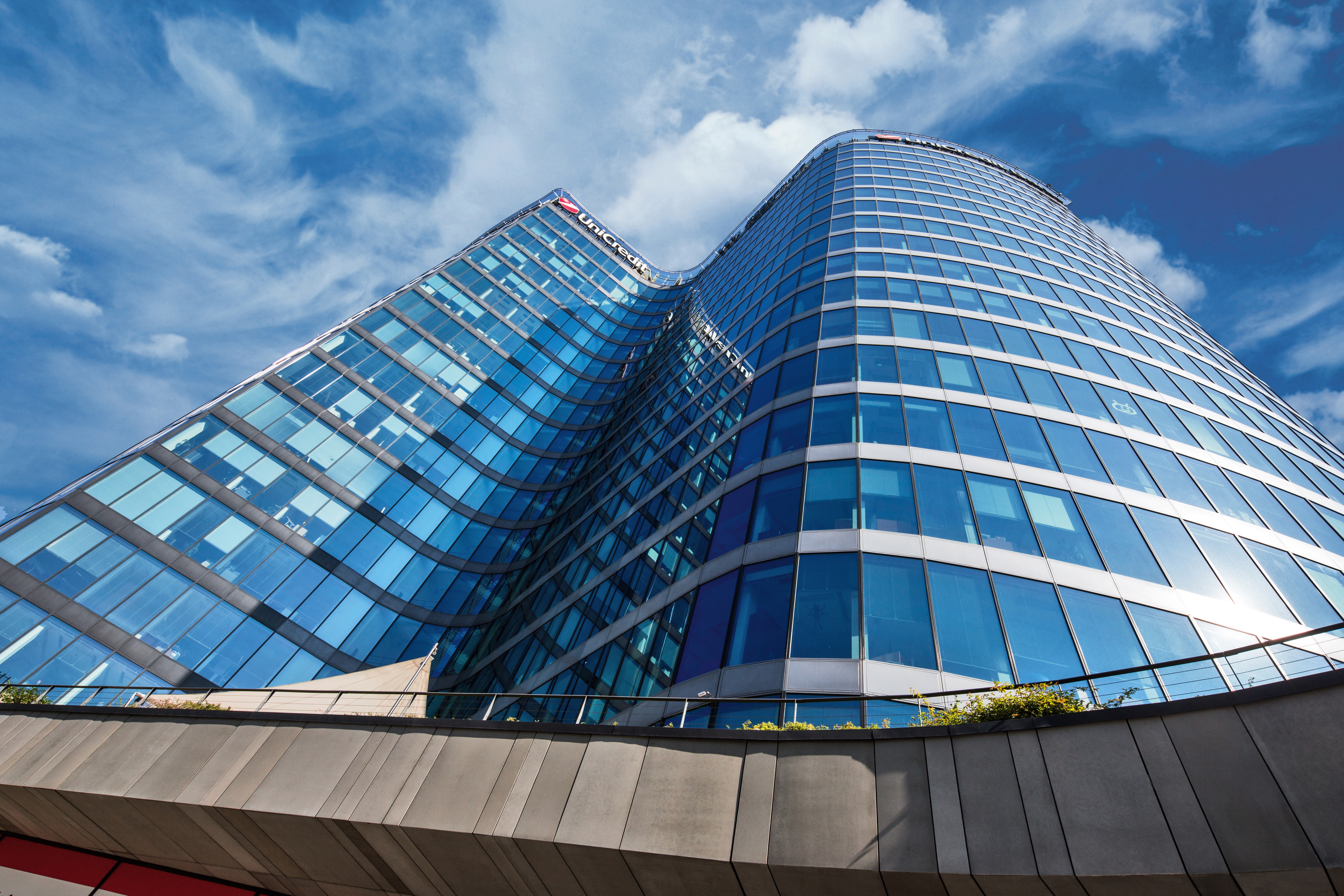
UniCredit Bank in Prague, Czech Republic

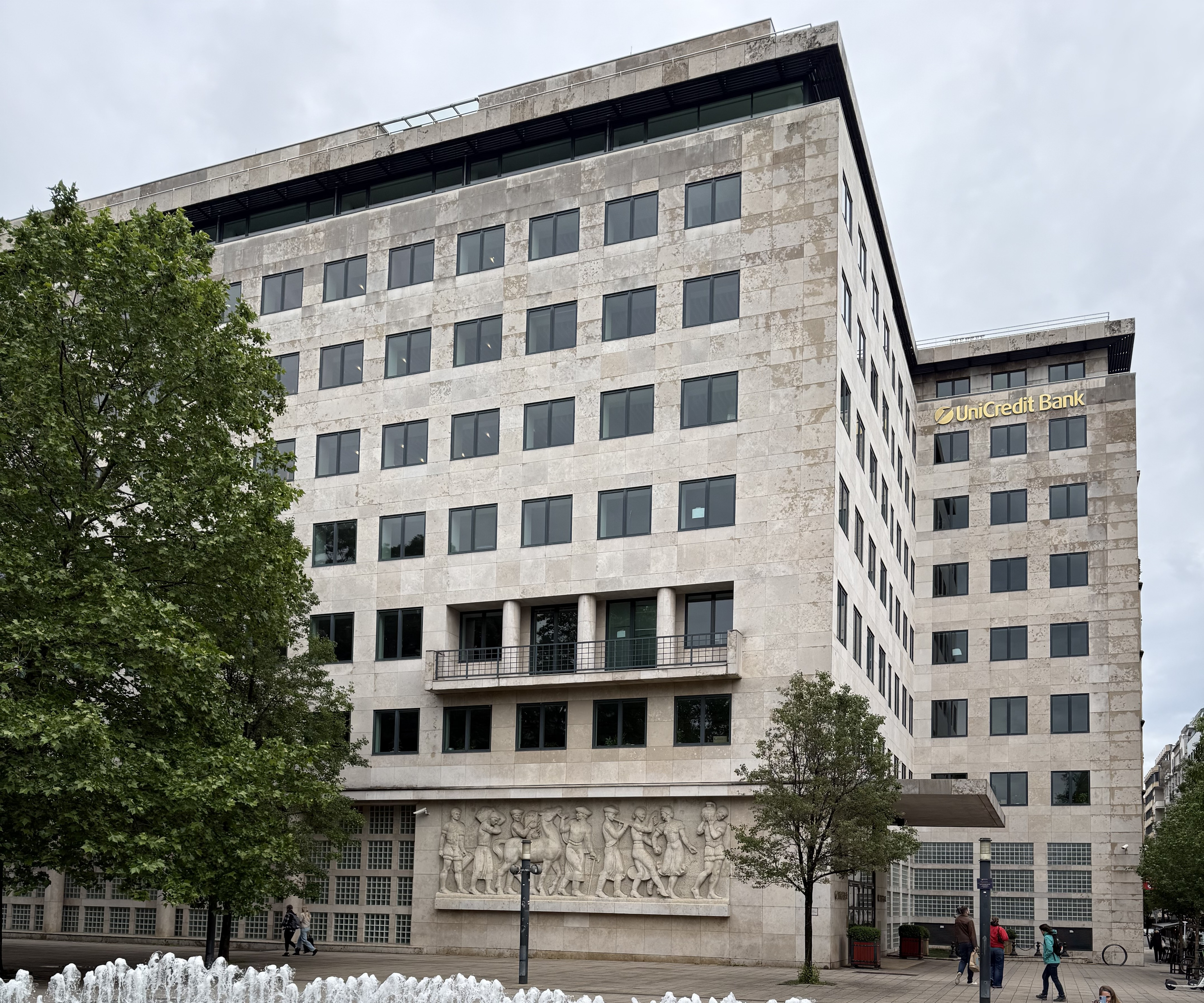
UniCredit Bank in Budapest, Hungary

UniCredit Bulbank in Sofia, Bulgaria

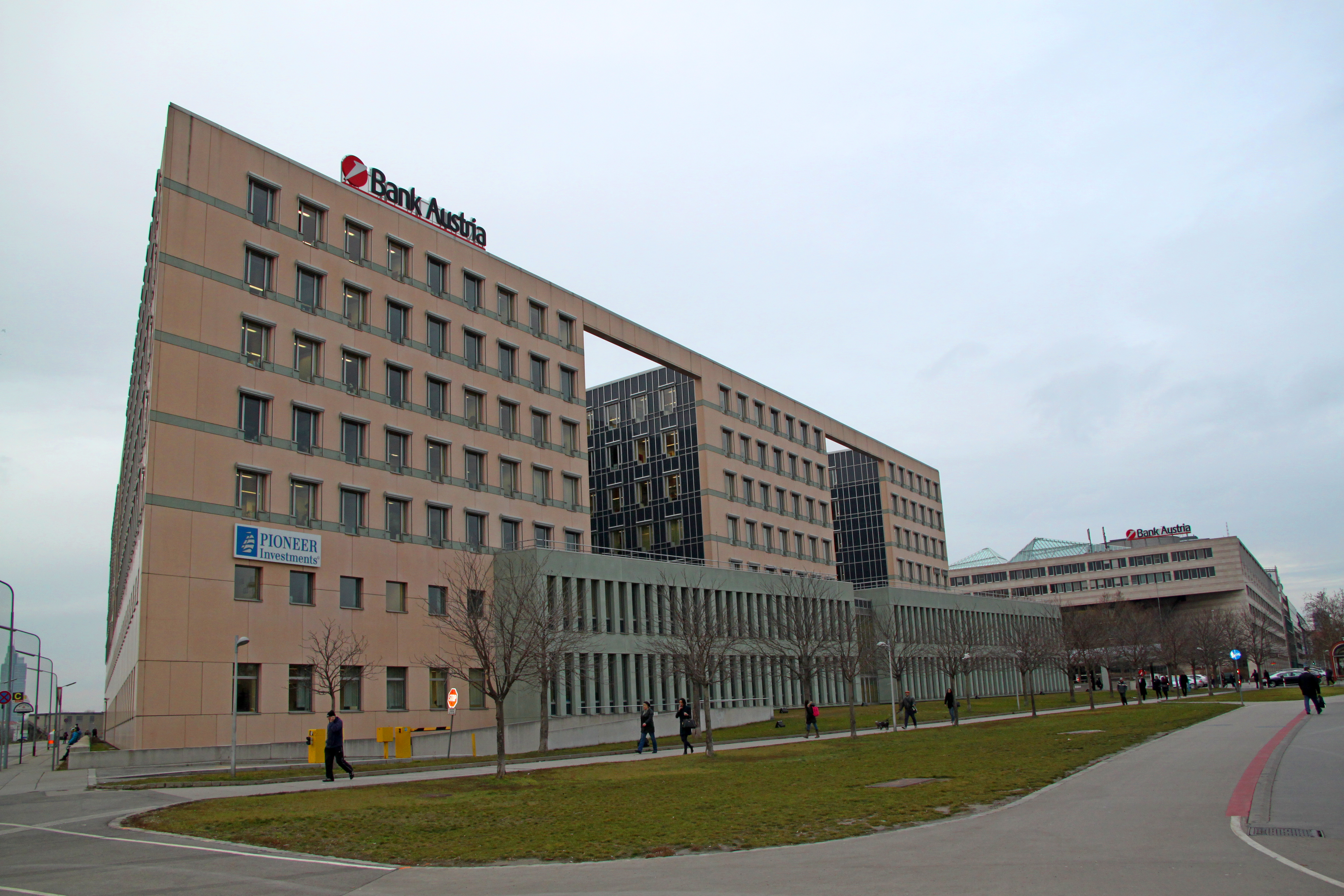
Bank Austria in Vienna, Austria

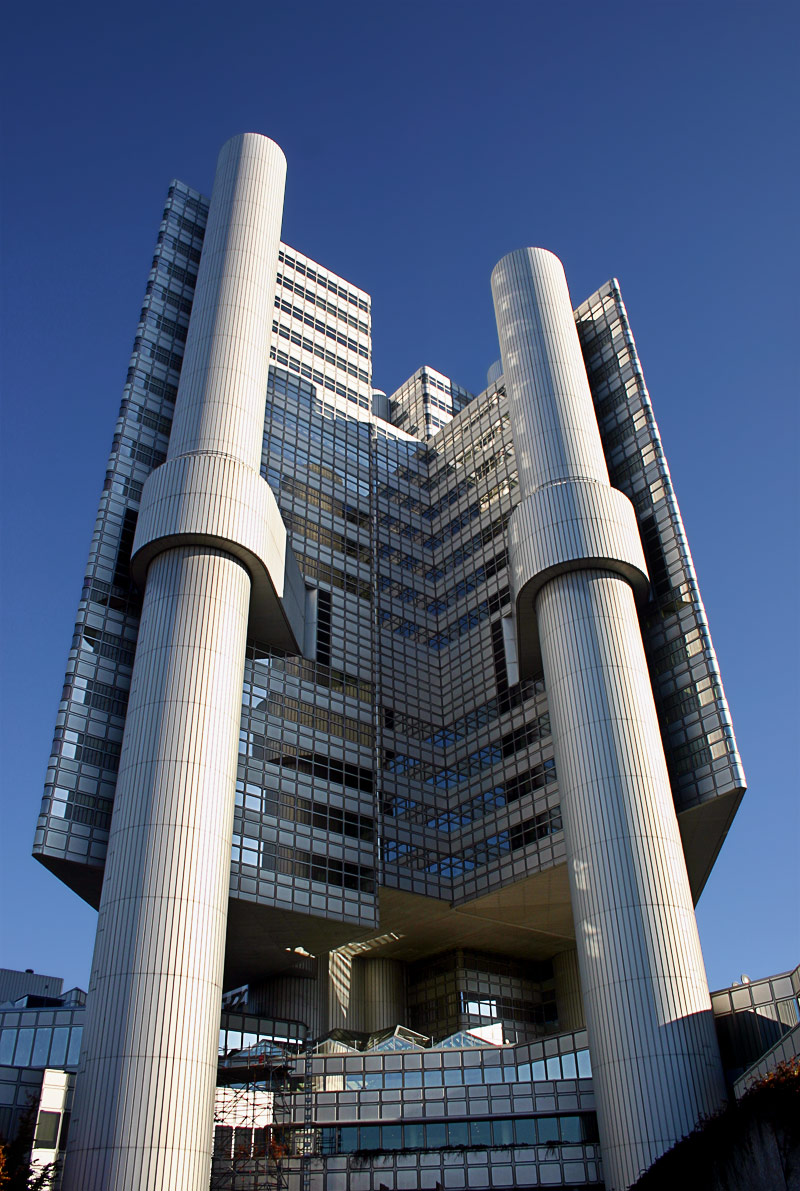
HypoVereinsbank in Munich, Germany

== Business in Russia ==
After a Russian invasion of Ukraine on February 24, 2022, UniCredit's Chief Executive Officer, Andrea Orcel, announced in March 2022 that the bank was actively considering leaving the Russian market. Prior to the invasion, UniCredit had even considered buying the Russian bank Otkrytie. In March 2022, the bank estimated possible losses from exiting the Russian market at €7.4 billion. In May 2022, it became known that UniCredit had reserved more than €1 billion for possible losses in the Russian Federation, while still considering leaving the market.

Later in May 2022, it was reported that UniCredit and Citigroup were considering exchanging assets in Russia. UniCredit's position has been that it is unwilling to sell its business at undervalued prices and does not want to face serious financial losses. According to the Financial Times, billionaire Volodymyr Potanin's "Interros" was one of the contenders to purchase the bank's business, but UniCredit denied the proposal due to unfavorable conditions. Raiffeisen Bank International and UniCredit are the only foreign banks on the central bank's list of 13 "systemically important credit institutions," and are therefore extremely important in the Russian financial system. In 2022, UniCredit's total revenue exceeded €20 billion, with more than €1 billion coming from its Russian operations. In April 2022, the European Central Bank issued an order to reduce operations in Russia. On June 29, UniCredit filed a lawsuit with the European Court of Justice, demanding that the demands be declared illegal, since its activities in Russia are carried out outside the jurisdiction of the ECB.

In May 2024, a Russian court authorized the seizure of €462.7 million of Unicredit's assets.

== Financial indicators ==
	2017	2018	2019	2020	2021	2022	2023	2024	2025
Total revenue (€ bn)	16.4	16.6	15.1	11.8	13.8	18.1	23.0	24.0	25.1
Net profit (€ bn)	5.5	3.9	3.4	(2.8)	1.5	6.5	9.5	9.7	10.9
Total assets (€ bn)	837	831	856	931	917	858	785	784	870
Return on Equity (%)	5.59	6.57	3.24	-4.89	2.49	10.17	14.65	14.97	16.46
Non-performing loans (%)	10.21	7.41	5	4.2	3.24	2.42	2.35	2.25	2.33
Employees	91,950	86,790	84,240	82,110	78,570	75,040	70,750	65,390	62,810

== Ownership ==
In February 2026, UniCredit's main shareholders are:

- BlackRock : 7.377%
- Capital Research & Management Co. (World Investors) : 5.163 %;
- Parvus Asset Management Europe Ltd. : 3.28 %;
- Norges Bank Investment Management : 3.01 %;
- Allianz SpA : 2.977 %;
- Famille Del Vecchio : 2.764 %;
- Fondazione Cassa di Risparmio di Torino : 2.36 %;
- Fondazione Cassa di Risparmio di Verona Vicenza Belluno : 1.284 %;
- Central Bank of Libya : 1.171 %.

In February 2025, Delfin started having discussions about the sale of its 2.7% stake in UniCredit via an accelerated book building. This is potentially worth nearly 2 billion Euro. UniCredit CEO Andrea Orcel acknowledged Delfin as a strong long-term investor but is aiming to prove that the sale of the stake would be a wrong decision.

== Subsidiaries ==
- Alpha Bank (Greece)
- Bank Austria & Schoellerbank (Austria)
- HypoVereinsbank (Germany)
- UniCredit Bank Czech Republic and Slovakia (Czech Republic, Slovakia)
- UniCredit Bank Hungary (Hungary)
- UniCredit Bank Romania - Merger of Alpha Bank Romania with UniCredit Bank Romania - (Romania)
- UniCredit Bank Russia (Russia)
- UniCredit Bank Serbia (Serbia)
- UniCredit Bank Slovenia (Slovenia)
- UniCredit Bulbank (Bulgaria)
- UniCredit Corporate & Investment Banking (Italy)
- UniCredit International Bank Luxembourg (Luxembourg)
- UniCredit Leasing (Italy)
- Zagrebačka banka (Croatia)
- UniCredit Bank Mostar, UniCredit Bank Banja Luka (Bosnia and Herzegovina)
- UniCredit Belgium - former Aion Bank (Belgium)
- UniCredit Poland - former Aion Bank & Vodeno (Poland)

=== Former subsidiaries ===
- Bank Pekao (Poland) (1999-2016)
- UniCredit Bank (Baltics) (-2013)
- ATF Bank (Kazakhstan, Kyrgyzstan) (-2013)
- UniCredit Bank (Ukraine) (1999-2016)
- YapıKredi (Turkey, Azerbaijan) (2006–2020)

== Sponsorship ==
UniCredit Group had sponsored tennis tournaments Czech Open, Vienna Open (by subsidiary Bank Austria), golf tournaments Ladies German Open (by subsidiary HypoVereinsbank and UniCredit) and Austrian Open (by subsidiary Bank Austria).

From 2009 to 2018, UniCredit was one of the main sponsors of UEFA Champions League. From 2025 onwards, UniCredit entered into a sponsorship deal with Scuderia Ferrari.

== See also ==
- List of bank mergers
- List of banks in the euro area
- List of banks in Italy
