= 2000–01 Serie B =

Italian football league season

Serie B TIM
- Season: 2000–01
- Promoted: Torino (3rd title); Piacenza; Chievo; Venezia
- Relegated: Pescara; Ravenna; Monza; Treviso
- Matches: 380
- Goals: 937 (2.47 per match)
- Top goalscorer: (Italy) Nicola Caccia (23 goals)

Serie B 2000-01 team distribution

The Serie B 2000–01 was the sixty-ninth tournament of this competition played in Italy since its creation.

== Teams ==
Siena, Crotone, Cittadella and Ancona had been promoted from Serie C, while Torino, Venezia FC, Cagliari and Piacenza had been relegated from Serie A.

=== Personnel and sponsoring ===
Team	Manager	Kit manufacturer	Shirt sponsor
Ancona	(Italy) Fabio Brini	Ropam	Carilo/Banca Marche
Cagliari	(Italy) Giuseppe Materazzi	Uhlsport	Pecorino Sardo/Terra Sarda
Chievo Verona	(Italy) Luigi Delneri	Hummel	Paluani
Cittadella	(Italy) Ezio Glerean	Hummel	Imasaf
Cosenza	(Italy) Bortolo Mutti	Legea	Provincia di Cosenza
Crotone	(Italy) Giuseppe Papadopulo	Devis	Caffè Guglielmo
Empoli	(Italy) Silvio Baldini	Erreà	Computer Gross
Genoa	(Italy) Franco Scoglio	Kappa	None (Note: The phrase "Nube che corre" was featured on the shirt.)
Monza	(Italy) Gaetano Salvemini	Legea	ghostyclub.com
Pescara	(Italy) Delio Rossi	Puma	Gelati Gis
Piacenza	(Italy) Walter Novellino	Lotto	Copra Ristorazione Servizi (H)/Gruppo DAC Arco (A)
Pistoiese	(Italy) Walter Nicoletti	Erreà	Vannucci Piante
Ravenna	(Italy) Stefano Di Chiara	Erreà	Associazione italiana contro le leucemie-linfomi e mieloma
Salernitana	(Italy) Francesco Oddo	In-house (Note: The logo of TELE+ Digitale was featured instead of a kit manufacturer logo)	ICS Personal Computer/Compuprint/Exigo Jeans
Sampdoria	(Italy) Luigi Cagni	Asics	Dreamcast
Siena	(Italy) Antonio Sala	Lotto	Romagest
Ternana	(Italy) Andrea Agostinelli	Erreà	ONBanca
Torino	(Italy) Giancarlo Camolese	Kelme	Directa SIM
Treviso	(Italy) Mauro Sandreani	Lotto	Segafredo
Venezia	(Italy) Cesare Prandelli	Kronos	Emmezeta

== Final classification ==
Pos	Team	Pld	W	D	L	GF	GA	GD	Pts	Promotion or relegation
1	Torino (P, C)	38	22	7	9	48	33	+15	73	Promotion to Serie A
2	Piacenza (P)	38	20	10	8	51	34	+17	70	Promotion to Serie A
3	Chievo (P)	38	19	13	6	54	34	+20	70	Promotion to Serie A
4	Venezia (P)	38	19	12	7	62	43	+19	69	Promotion to Serie A
5	Empoli	38	18	10	10	52	43	+9	64	
6	Sampdoria	38	16	16	6	60	38	+22	64	
7	Ternana	38	16	14	8	59	38	+21	62	
8	Cosenza	38	17	9	12	49	46	+3	60	
9	Crotone	38	15	8	15	47	53	−6	53	
10	Ancona	38	14	9	15	56	58	−2	51	
11	Cagliari	38	12	14	12	53	45	+8	50	
12	Siena	38	10	17	11	38	43	−5	47	
13	Genoa	38	10	17	11	44	39	+5	47	
14	Cittadella	38	10	15	13	40	52	−12	45	
15	Salernitana	38	11	10	17	37	42	−5	43	
16	Pistoiese	38	10	11	17	46	51	−5	41	
17	Treviso (R)	38	8	12	18	40	56	−16	36	Relegation to Serie C1
18	Monza (R)	38	9	4	25	41	77	−36	31	Relegation to Serie C1
19	Ravenna (R)	38	4	13	21	33	64	−31	25	Relegation to Serie C1
20	Pescara (R)	38	3	13	22	30	56	−26	22	Relegation to Serie C1

Source: Almanacco Illustrato del Calcio - La Storia 1898-2004, Panini Edizioni, Modena, September 2005
Rules for classification: 1) points; 2) head-to-head points; 3) head-to-head goal difference; 4) head-to-head goals scored; 5) goal difference; 6) number of goals scored.
(C) Champions; (P) Promoted; (R) Relegated

== Results ==
Home \ Away	ANC	CAG	CHV	CIT	COS	CRO	EMP	GEN	MON	PES	PIA	PST	RAV	SAL	SAM	SIE	TER	TOR	TRV	VEN
Ancona	—	1–1	5–2	1–1	3–1	2–0	1–0	1–0	1–0	3–2	0–2	2–1	2–5	4–1	0–0	2–1	3–1	1–2	3–1	0–0
Cagliari	2–2	—	1–1	3–0	1–1	4–0	2–3	3–0	2–1	2–1	0–0	0–0	2–0	1–1	1–1	0–0	1–1	0–1	3–2	2–1
Chievo	1–0	2–1	—	2–2	2–1	3–1	1–0	1–0	5–1	0–2	1–1	1–1	0–0	2–0	1–1	2–1	2–1	4–2	2–1	2–1
Cittadella	2–0	2–0	0–0	—	0–1	2–0	2–2	1–1	0–1	1–1	0–2	2–1	1–0	1–1	2–2	0–0	3–1	2–1	2–2	2–1
Cosenza	3–2	1–3	1–2	1–0	—	3–0	1–1	1–0	1–0	1–0	2–1	1–3	3–1	1–0	4–4	3–1	0–0	0–2	3–2	1–0
Crotone	1–0	2–1	0–2	2–2	1–2	—	3–1	0–0	2–1	2–0	2–0	1–0	2–1	0–1	1–1	2–2	0–2	0–1	4–3	2–2
Empoli	3–1	0–3	1–1	2–0	0–1	4–2	—	0–0	4–2	2–1	1–0	0–2	3–2	2–1	0–0	2–0	0–0	2–1	2–1	2–3
Genoa	3–1	2–0	0–1	3–1	2–1	2–0	1–2	—	3–1	0–0	1–1	0–0	1–1	1–2	2–0	1–1	2–2	2–1	0–0	1–1
Monza	1–1	1–0	1–3	1–0	4–2	0–1	0–1	1–5	—	1–0	1–1	3–1	0–1	1–0	0–4	1–2	1–1	2–3	1–1	2–3
Pescara	2–3	0–0	0–2	2–0	0–0	1–2	1–3	1–1	1–2	—	0–0	0–1	1–1	2–2	2–2	0–0	1–3	0–1	0–3	2–3
Piacenza	1–1	0–0	1–0	3–0	2–0	1–2	2–0	2–1	1–0	2–1	—	1–0	1–0	3–1	2–1	2–3	3–0	3–1	1–1	1–0
Pistoiese	1–1	4–2	1–0	0–1	1–1	0–4	1–2	3–3	3–1	1–0	1–1	—	2–2	1–1	3–1	0–1	2–3	1–1	0–1	1–2
Ravenna	1–0	2–4	0–0	0–0	0–1	1–2	0–2	1–1	2–3	2–3	0–2	1–4	—	1–1	0–0	2–1	2–2	1–2	1–1	0–3
Salernitana	4–2	2–1	1–1	3–0	0–1	0–1	0–0	0–1	2–0	3–1	3–0	1–0	1–0	—	2–3	3–0	0–0	0–2	0–1	0–1
Sampdoria	3–1	2–1	1–1	2–0	1–0	2–1	0–1	2–0	4–2	1–1	0–1	2–2	2–0	2–0	—	1–1	2–1	2–0	2–0	4–1
Siena	4–1	1–1	1–1	1–1	1–0	1–1	1–1	1–0	3–1	0–0	0–0	1–0	5–1	0–0	0–0	—	0–0	0–2	2–0	1–3
Ternana	3–2	1–0	1–0	4–1	1–1	0–0	2–0	1–0	4–1	3–0	0–1	3–2	4–0	0–0	1–1	4–0	—	0–1	3–1	3–1
Torino	0–2	2–0	0–0	2–2	2–1	1–0	1–0	1–1	2–1	1–0	1–0	2–0	2–1	2–0	1–0	1–1	1–1	—	1–0	0–1
Treviso	0–0	2–3	0–2	1–2	1–1	3–2	1–1	2–2	3–0	1–0	0–3	1–2	0–0	1–0	0–2	1–0	1–1	1–1	—	0–1
Venezia	2–1	2–2	2–1	2–2	2–2	1–1	2–2	1–1	4–1	1–1	1–0	1–0	0–0	2–0	2–2	3–0	2–1	1–0	3–0	—

Source: Almanacco Illustrato del Calcio - La Storia 1898-2004, Panini Edizioni, Modena, September 2005
Legend: Blue = home team win; Yellow = draw; Red = away team win.

== Attendances ==
#	Club	Average
1	Torino	17,027
2	Sampdoria	16,476
3	Genoa	15,512
4	Salernitana	11,526
5	Cagliari	8,209
6	Ternana	8,050
7	Ancona	6,545
8	Cosenza	6,424
9	Venezia	6,079
10	Piacenza	6,060
11	Crotone	5,410
12	Siena	5,376
13	Chievo	5,139
14	Pistoiese	4,336
15	Treviso	3,143
16	Pescara	3,077
17	Ravenna	3,070
18	Empoli	3,039
19	Monza	2,169
20	Cittadella	2,162
