= Cassa di Risparmio di Fermo =

Italian savings bank

Savings Bank of Fermo
- Trade name: Carifermo
- Native name: Cassa di Risparmio di Fermo S.p.A.
- Type: Private
- Industry: Financial services
- Founded: 5 July 1857; 21 December 1991 (S.p.A.)
- Successor: Fondazione Carifermo (charity activities only)
- Headquarters: 1 Via Don Ernesto Ricci, Fermo, Italy
- Number of locations: 60 branches (2014)
- Area served: Marche; Abruzzo (Pescara, Teramo & Silvi); Lazio (Rome only)
- Brands: Carifermo h24
- Services: Retail and corporate banking
- Net income: ▲€7,059,421 (2015)
- Total assets: ▼€1,720,790,030 (2015)
- Total equity: ▲€167,336,368 (2015)
- Owner: Fondazione Carifermo (66.7%); Intesa Sanpaolo (33.3%)
- Parent: Fondazione Carifermo
- Capital ratio: 16.06% (CET1)
- Website: carifermo.it

Cassa di Risparmio di Fermo S.p.A. (Carifermo) is an Italian savings bank based in Fermo, Marche region.

== History ==
Cassa di Risparmio di Fermo was found on 5 July 1857 in the Papal States, which was approved by Pope Pius IX on 29 April. In 1920s, the bank absorbed Cassa di Risparmio di Montottone, Cassa Rurale di Montottone, Cassa di Risparmio di Falerone and Cassa Rurale di Santo Stefano di Monterubbiano. In 1940 Cassa di Risparmio di Sant'Elpidio was absorbed into the bank.

Due to Legge Amato, the bank was split into a company limited by shares (Italian: società per azioni) and Fondazione Cassa di Risparmio di Fermo (the banking foundation) in 1991 (approved on 21 December 1991; gazetted on 24 January 1992).

Cassa di Risparmio delle Provincie Lombarde (Cariplo) acquired a minority interests in the bank for 33.3% shares in late 1990s. Cariplo also had a minority interests in neighboring savings bank (Italian: Cassa di Risparmio): Ascoli Piceno (Marche), Teramo, Pescara, Chieti (Abruzzo), Foligno, Spoleto (Umbria), Rieti (Lazio) as well as Banca delle Marche (the successor of CR Jesi) and a majority interests in Città di Castello. However, despite Cariplo was merged with Banco Ambrosiano Veneto in 1998, Banca Commerciale Italiana in 1999, Sanpaolo IMI in 2007, Banca CR Firenze in 2008, the foundation remained to control Carifermo, with Intesa Sanpaolo, a successor of Banca Intesa and Cariplo, was the latest owner of the remaining 33.3% shares.

The bank is the only independent savings bank of Marche which is still controlled by the banking foundation; Cassa di Risparmio di Loreto (Carilo) was a subsidiary of Banca delle Marche; Banca delle Marche was bail-out and nationalized in 2015 by Italian National Resolution Fund; both Carilo and new Banca Marche were absorbed by new owner UBI Banca in October 2017.

== See also ==
- other Marche-based bank
  - Banca delle Marche, an Italian bank
    - Cassa di Risparmio di Loreto, a Banca delle Marche subsidiary

  - Banca dell'Adriatico, a defunct subsidiary of Intesa Sanpaolo
  - Banca Popolare di Ancona, a defunct UBI Banca subsidiary
  - Cassa di Risparmio di Ascoli Piceno, a defunct subsidiary of Intesa Sanpaolo
  - Cassa di Risparmio di Fabriano e Cupramontana, a defunct subsidiary of Veneto Banca
  - Cassa di Risparmio di Fano, a defunct Credito Valtellinese subsidiary
  - Cassa di Risparmio della Provincia di Macerata, a predecessor of Banca delle Marche
  - Cassa di Risparmio di Pesaro, a predecessor of Banca delle Marche
  - Cassa di Risparmio di Jesi, a predecessor of Banca delle Marche
