= 2001–02 Serie B =

Italian football league season

Serie B TIM
- Season: 2001–02
- Promoted: Como (3rd title); Modena; Reggina; Empoli
- Relegated: Crotone; Pistoiese; Cittadella
- Matches: 380
- Goals: 934 (2.46 per match)
- Top goalscorer: (Belgium) Luís Oliveira (23 goals)

Serie B 2001-02 team distribution

The 2001–02 Serie B is the 70th season since its establishment in 1929. It is the second highest football league in Italy.

== Teams ==
Modena, Palermo, Como and Messina had been promoted from Serie C, while Reggina, Vicenza, Napoli and Bari had been relegated from Serie A.

=== Personnel and sponsoring ===
Team	Manager	Kit manufacturer	Shirt sponsor
Ancona	(Italy) Luciano Spalletti	Ropam	Banca Marche
Bari	(Italy) Attilio Perotti	Lotto	None
Cagliari	(Italy) Nedo Sonetti	Uhlsport	Terra Sarda
Cittadella	(Italy) Ezio Glerean	Legea	Imasaf
Como	(Italy) Loris Dominissini	Erreà	Magiste International
Cosenza	(Italy) Luigi De Rosa	Legea	Provincia di Cosenza
Crotone	(Italy) Franco Selvaggi	Devis	Caffè Guglielmo
Empoli	(Italy) Silvio Baldini	Erreà	Computer Gross
Genoa	(Italy) Claudio Onofri	Erreà	None
Messina	(Italy) Daniele Arrigoni	Asics	Jonax Group
Modena	(Italy) Gianni De Biasi	Erreà	Immergas
Napoli	(Italy) Luigi De Canio	Diadora	Peroni
Palermo	(Italy) Bortolo Mutti	Lotto	Le Telecomunicazioni del Sud
Pistoiese	(Italy) Walter Nicoletti	Garman	Vannucci Piante
Reggina	(Italy) Franco Colomba	Asics	Caffè Mauro
Salernitana	(Czech Republic) Zdeněk Zeman	In-house (Note: The logo of TELE+ Digitale was featured instead of a kit manufacturer logo)	ICS Personal Computer
Sampdoria	(Italy) Gianfranco Bellotto	Asics	Grafoplast Wiremarkers
Siena	(Italy) Giuseppe Papadopulo	Lotto	Monte Paschi Vita
Ternana	(Italy) Bruno Bolchi	Erreà	Professionecasa
Vicenza	(Italy) Adelio Moro and (Italy) Fabio Viviani	Umbro	Artel Clima

== Final classification ==
Pos	Team	Pld	W	D	L	GF	GA	GD	Pts	Promotion or relegation
1	Como (P, C)	38	22	8	8	53	35	+18	74	Promotion to Serie A
2	Modena (P)	38	20	12	6	58	23	+35	72	Promotion to Serie A
3	Reggina (P)	38	19	11	8	50	33	+17	68	Promotion to Serie A
4	Empoli (P)	38	19	10	9	60	35	+25	67	Promotion to Serie A
5	Napoli	38	16	13	9	48	39	+9	61	
6	Bari	38	14	11	13	44	51	−7	53	
7	Salernitana	38	14	11	13	57	59	−2	53	
8	Ancona	38	14	8	16	43	52	−9	50	
9	Vicenza	38	12	13	13	50	52	−2	49	
10	Palermo	38	12	12	14	47	54	−7	48	
11	Sampdoria	38	12	12	14	42	46	−4	48	
12	Siena	38	12	11	15	35	44	−9	47	
13	Cagliari	38	10	17	11	39	39	0	47	
14	Genoa	38	10	17	11	43	40	+3	47	
15	Cosenza	38	13	8	17	47	57	−10	47	
16	Messina	38	11	14	13	41	42	−1	47	
17	Ternana (T)	38	9	18	11	46	49	−3	45	Re-admitted (Note: Relegated and later readmitted after Fiorentina's bankruptcy in Serie A.)
18	Cittadella (R)	38	9	10	19	49	63	−14	37	Relegation to Serie C1
19	Pistoiese (R)	38	8	12	18	38	51	−13	36	Relegation to Serie C1
20	Crotone (R)	38	5	10	23	44	70	−26	25	Relegation to Serie C1

Source: Almanacco Illustrato del Calcio - La Storia 1898-2004, Panini Edizioni, Modena, September 2005
Rules for classification: 1) points; 2) head-to-head points; 3) head-to-head goal difference; 4) head-to-head goals scored; 5) goal difference; 6) number of goals scored.
(C) Champions; (P) Promoted; (R) Relegated; (T) Qualified, but not yet for the particular phase indicated

== Results ==
Home \ Away	ANC	BAR	CAG	CIT	COM	COS	CRO	EMP	GEN	MES	MOD	NAP	PAL	PST	REG	SAL	SAM	SIE	TER	VIC
Ancona	—	3–1	0–1	0–1	1–1	2–3	1–0	3–2	1–1	1–1	0–3	0–1	3–3	2–1	1–0	3–1	3–2	0–0	3–1	1–0
Bari	2–1	—	0–0	3–2	1–1	1–0	0–2	2–2	1–0	3–1	1–2	0–1	2–0	3–3	2–1	2–2	1–1	1–0	2–1	2–1
Cagliari	2–0	1–2	—	1–0	0–1	2–1	2–1	1–3	2–1	0–0	0–0	1–1	4–0	2–2	0–0	2–2	0–2	1–1	1–1	2–2
Cittadella	3–1	0–1	0–2	—	2–1	2–0	3–2	2–1	0–0	0–1	1–3	1–2	2–2	2–1	0–2	4–4	1–1	1–1	2–2	2–2
Como	1–0	2–0	4–0	4–3	—	2–0	1–1	2–0	2–1	2–1	1–0	0–2	3–0	2–2	1–2	1–0	3–1	0–1	2–0	1–0
Cosenza	3–0	2–1	1–0	2–1	1–4	—	1–0	0–3	2–1	0–0	0–1	1–1	3–2	1–2	0–1	2–3	0–0	2–1	2–2	2–1
Crotone	2–0	2–2	4–2	1–2	1–1	0–2	—	1–1	4–3	1–2	1–2	1–2	1–1	1–2	1–2	3–3	1–1	1–2	2–3	3–4
Empoli	5–0	5–1	2–1	0–0	0–1	1–2	1–0	—	1–0	2–0	0–0	1–0	5–3	1–1	2–1	3–1	2–0	2–1	2–2	2–0
Genoa	1–2	2–0	3–3	1–1	2–1	3–2	1–1	3–3	—	3–0	0–0	0–2	1–0	1–1	1–1	4–0	1–0	1–1	0–2	2–2
Messina	1–1	1–2	0–2	3–1	1–1	3–1	4–0	1–0	0–0	—	2–0	2–1	2–0	1–1	1–0	1–3	1–1	1–2	1–1	0–0
Modena	0–0	2–0	3–0	4–2	3–0	1–1	2–0	0–1	0–0	1–1	—	4–1	2–0	1–0	3–1	5–2	2–0	2–2	2–0	0–1
Napoli	1–2	1–0	0–0	1–1	1–2	4–2	0–0	0–0	2–1	1–0	1–0	—	3–2	3–1	1–1	1–1	1–1	2–0	1–1	0–0
Palermo	2–3	0–0	0–0	3–1	0–0	1–1	2–0	1–0	1–0	1–0	2–1	1–1	—	1–0	4–2	1–1	2–0	0–2	3–0	1–3
Pistoiese	1–0	1–0	0–1	1–0	0–1	0–1	4–1	0–1	0–1	2–1	0–0	1–1	0–2	—	1–2	1–2	0–2	0–2	3–3	1–1
Reggina	1–0	0–0	0–0	1–0	4–1	1–0	2–0	1–0	2–2	0–0	0–1	3–1	1–1	3–2	—	2–2	2–0	1–0	2–0	2–0
Salernitana	2–0	2–3	1–0	3–2	1–2	2–1	0–0	1–0	0–1	1–2	1–1	3–1	2–1	2–1	1–2	—	2–0	1–0	0–0	0–0
Sampdoria	0–3	3–0	3–3	2–1	2–1	1–1	0–2	0–2	0–0	2–1	1–1	0–2	1–2	2–0	0–0	2–1	—	0–1	4–2	2–1
Siena	0–0	1–1	1–0	0–1	0–1	2–0	2–1	1–1	0–1	1–0	0–1	2–1	1–1	0–0	2–2	2–1	0–4	—	0–3	2–4
Ternana	0–1	1–1	0–0	2–1	0–0	2–2	3–2	1–1	0–0	2–2	0–0	1–2	2–0	0–1	1–0	0–2	0–0	3–0	—	3–1
Vicenza	2–1	1–0	0–0	2–1	1–2	3–2	4–0	1–2	0–0	2–2	0–5	2–1	1–1	1–1	1–2	3–1	0–1	2–1	1–1	—

Source: Almanacco Illustrato del Calcio - La Storia 1898-2004, Panini Edizioni, Modena, September 2005
Legend: Blue = home team win; Yellow = draw; Red = away team win.

== Attendances ==
No.	Club	Average	Highest
1	Napoli	17,386	64,234
2	Reggina	16,779	23,794
3	Genoa	16,159	36,736
4	Sampdoria	13,069	33,057
5	Salernitana	11,624	25,899
6	Palermo	10,363	24,896
7	Modena	9,244	13,574
8	Vicenza	8,536	12,663
9	Messina	7,641	9,200
10	Ternana	7,385	11,390
11	Ancona	6,396	10,399
12	Cagliari	6,368	18,000
13	Como	5,715	8,849
14	Crotone	5,214	7,200
15	Cosenza	4,490	10,991
16	Siena	4,444	8,006
17	Empoli	4,216	8,724
18	Pistoiese	3,031	5,603
19	Bari	2,832	4,682
20	Cittadella	1,773	5,451
