= Cassa di Risparmio di Loreto =

- Trade name: Carilo
- Company type: subsidiary
- Industry: Financial services
- Founded: 1861
- Defunct: 23 October 2017
- Fate: became UBI Banca branches
- Headquarters: Loreto, Italy
- Number of locations: 15 branches (2016)
- Area served: Marche region
- Key people: Costantino Vitali (Chairman)
- Services: Retail banking
- Net income: ▼ (€28 million) (2016)
- Total assets: ▲€590 million (2016)
- Total equity: ▼€8 million (2016)
Owner
UBI Banca (via Banca Marche)	(94.65%)
Carilo Foundation	(5.35%)
Parent
Banca Marche	(direct)
UBI Banca	(ultimate)
- Capital ratio: ▼2.5756% (CET1, Dec.2016)
- Website: carilo.it
- Footnotes / references source

Cassa di Risparmio di Loreto S.p.A. also known as Carilo was an Italian savings bank based in Loreto, in the Province of Ancona. It was one of the 7 saving banks in Marche region in 1990s. 3 out of 7 saving banks were predecessors of Banca delle Marche banking group, which acquired Carilo in 1997; In January 2017 [New] Banca delle Marche banking group was acquired by UBI Banca, after [old] Banca Marche was nationalized in November 2015.

== History ==
Monte di Risparmio della Città di Loreto was founded in 1861 in unified Italy. It was renamed to Cassa di Risparmio di Loreto in the next year. in 1927 the bank absorbed "Cassa di Prestiti e Risparmio di Castelfidardo". Due to "Amato" Law, the banking activities was incorporated as a Società per azioni, while the original banking organization was renamed to the Ente Cassa di Risparmio di Loreto (later renamed to the Fondazione Cassa di Risparmio di Loreto; Carilo Foundation) The ente owned 71.43% shares of the S.p.A. In 1997 Banca delle Marche became the parent company of the banking S.p.A. for 78.81% shares, with the rest were held by the banking foundation of Carilo. The move made Banca delle Marche one of the largest banking group in the region, which owned 4 out of 7 saving banks of Marche. (the remain 3 saving banks were C.R. Fabriano e Cupramontana and C.R. Ascoli (acquired by nationwide banking group and defunct in 2000s) and C.R. Fermo)

In 1996, in terms of market share in deposits in the Province of Ancona, Carilo had a market share of 4.8%, and the pro forma market share of Banca Marche banking group was 32.3%, ahead competitors Banca Popolare di Bergamo (mainly via subsidiary Banca Popolare di Ancona, predecessor of UBI Banca), Unicredito (mainly via subsidiary Cariverona, predecessor of UniCredit), Banca di Roma (predecessor of Capitalia; acquired by UniCredit in 2007), Cassa di Risparmio di Fabriano e Cupramontana (acquired by Veneto Banca) which had a market share of 13%, 11%, 9.8% and 9.6% respectively.

Followed by the special administration (Italian: amministrazione straordinaria, A.S.) of Banca delle Marche by the Italian State in 2013, on 17 April 2014 Carilo was also under administration (by the decree of Ministry of Economy and Finance but the Bank of Italy was the actual administrator); On 31 December 2013, Carilo had a CET1 Capital Ratio of just 5.1287%, as well as a shareholders' equity of about €32.6 million.

After Banca delle Marche was nationalized by Italian National Resolution Fund in November 2015, a fund that was mandatory contributed by the banking industry, Carilo was recapitalized for €32.5 million. Also due to decrease in risk-weight assets of the bank, Carilo returned to financial health that had a CET1 Ratio of 9.1127% on 31 December 2015. Due to diversified investment of the banking foundation, the dilution of its shares in the bank to 5.35%, had a minimal impact to the balance sheet of the foundation. The foundation had an equity of €28.5 million.

In January 2017, UBI Banca signed a contract to buy Nuova Banca delle Marche banking group as well as two banks that were also rescued by Italian National Resolution Fund, for a nominal fee of €1. Before the closing the deal, Bank of Italy as the administrator, would also make a further balance sheet cleanup and re-capitalized the banks. UBI Banca's subsidiary Banca Popolare di Ancona was also based in the Province of Ancona which Carilo was located, the deal got the approval from the trade union despite a concern of overlapping of banking network. The Italian Competition Authority also found out that, in the Province of Ancona, which Carilo was located, the pro-forma market share of the post-merger banking group (based on 2015 data), was over 40%.

On 28 March 2017, another capital increase of about €19 million was announced. On 10 May, the acquisition by UBI Banca was completed. On the same day a plan to absorb parent company Banca Marche and Cassa di Risparmio di Loreto into UBI Banca was also announced.

The merger was completed on 23 October 2017, which the minority shareholders of Carilo was offered 0.635 shares of UBI Banca to 1 share of Carilo, on a valuation of €1.4 per share of Carilo.

== See also ==
- List of banks in Italy
