= Banca Regionale Europea =

- Native name: Banca Regionale Europea S.p.A.
- Company type: Subsidiary
- Industry: Financial services
- Predecessor: Cassa di Risparmio di Cuneo; Banca del Monte di Lombardia
- Founded: 1995
- Defunct: November 2016
- Fate: absorbed by UBI Banca
- Headquarters: Cuneo, Italy
- Area served: Piedmont, Aosta Valley, Liguria, Lombardy and Tuscany
- Net income: ▼€949,504 (2014)
- Total assets: ▼€9,448,281,446 (2014)
- Total equity: ▼€1,295,542,971 (2014)
Owner
UBI Banca	(74.76%)
CR Cuneo Foundation	(24.90%)
- Parent: UBI Banca
- Capital ratio: 18.80% (Tier 1)

Banca Regionale Europea was an Italian bank based in Cuneo, Piedmont. The bank was a merger of Cassa di Risparmio di Cuneo and Banca del Monte di Lombardia in 1995.

== History ==
In 2000, the bank joined Group Banca Lombarda e Piemontese. Banca Lombarda held 50.11% shares of BRE at that time, as well as sold all the shares it held at Banca Cassa di Risparmio di Tortona (60%; a bank based in Piedmont), to BRE. In 2006 Banca CR Tortona, was merged into Banca Regionale Europea, as well as Banco di San Giorgio in 2012. The bank also followed the holding company to join UBI Banca Group in 2007 (a merger with Banche Popolari Unite). As of 31 December 2014, out of 1560 branches of UBI Banca, 13% were Banca Regionale Europea (208), behind former sister companies of Group Banca Lombarda, Banco di Brescia 288, and former Banche Popolari Unite companies Banca Popolare di Bergamo (351), Banca Carime (216); as well as tied with Banca Popolare di Ancona (208).

As of 31 December 2014, the former owner of CR Cuneo, CR Cuneo Foundation, still held 24.90% of the shares of Banca Regionale Europea. In 2010 UBI Banca exchanged the shares of Banca Popolare Commercio e Industria and Banca Regionale Europea with the former owner of Banca del Monte di Lombardia. That year UBI Banca reached an ownership ratio of 74.9437%.

As part of the new business plan of the banking group, Banca Regionale Europea was absorbed into the parent company in November 2016.

== Sponsorship ==
The bank was a sponsor of A.S.D. Cuneo Calcio Femminile.

== See also ==
- List of banks in Italy
