= Aviva Italia Holding =

Italian holding company

- Native name: Aviva Italia Holding S.p.A.
- Type: Subsidiary of a listed company
- Industry: Financial services
- Headquarters: Milan, Italy
- Services: Life and non-life insurances
- Parent: Aviva
- Website: Official website (in Italian)

Aviva Italia Holding is an Italian holding company for the British multinational insurance company Aviva. According to Mediobanca, as of 2014 the group had a combined gross premiums written of €3,768,783,000 and was the 12th largest insurance company of Italy.

== History ==
In 1999, the predecessor of Aviva plc, CGU plc, via Commercial Union Italia, sold 50% stake in Commercial Union Life S.p.A. and Commercial Union Assicurazioni S.p.A. to Banca delle Marche, as part of a bancassurance business. The parent company in Italy became CGNU Holding S.p.A. in 2001, which became Aviva Italia Holding in 2002. The subsidiaries became Aviva Italia, Aviva Life and Aviva Assicurazioni. The group also owned an equity stake in Banca delle Marche until 2010. The minority interests in Aviva Life and Aviva Assicurazioni were also bought back in the same year from Banca delle Marche. Aviva Assicurazioni was absorbed by Aviva Italia on 1 January 2015.

Aviva also formed a joint venture in bancassurance with Banco Popolare (Avipop Vita and Avipop Assicurazioni) in 2007, as well as with UniCredit in 1989 (Aviva S.p.A.; ex-Commercial Union Vita), UBI Banca in 2003 (Aviva Vita; ex-Risparmio Vita Assicurazioni and Aviva Assicurazioni Vita; ex-UBI Assicurazioni Vita) and Banca Popolare di Lodi in 1998 (Eurovita Assicurazioni (sold to a private equity fund in 2014) and Aviva Previdenza, absorbed by Aviva Life on 1 January 2015).

In 2014 UBI Banca sold 30% stake in Aviva Vita and Aviva Assicurazioni Vita to Aviva Italia Holding; at the same time the equity stake held by Aviva Italia Holding in Banca Popolare Commercio e Industria, Banca Popolare di Ancona and Banca Carime were sold for €327 million.

== Subsidiaries ==
- Aviva Italia S.p.A.
- Aviva Life S.p.A.
- Aviva Vita S.p.A. (80%)
- Aviva Assicurazioni Vita S.p.A. (80%)
- Aviva S.p.A. (51%)
- Avipop Assicurazioni S.p.A. (50%)
- Avipop Vita S.p.A. (50%)
