= Cassa di Risparmio di Fano =

- Trade name: Carifano
- Type: subsidiary of a listed company
- Industry: Financial services
- Founded: 14 January 1843 in Fano; 28 May 1992 (as S.p.A.); 18 April 2011 (Nuova Carifano)
- Defunct: 2016
- Fate: absorbed by the parent company
- Successor: branches of Credito Valtellinese; Carifano Foundation (charity)
- Headquarters: Fano, Italy
- Number of locations: 40 branches (2015)
- Area served: Marche and Umbria regions
- Services: Retail banking
- Net income: ▲ (€6,749,974) (2015)
- Total assets: ▼€1,972,715,609 (2015)
- Total equity: ▼€107,973,861 (2015)
- Owner: Credito Valtellinese (100%)
- Parent: Credito Valtellinese
- Capital ratio: 9.56% (Tier 1)

Cassa di Risparmio di Fano S.p.A. (Carifano) was an Italian saving bank based in Fano, Marche. The bank had 40 branches all in Marche and Umbria. It was founded in 1843 and became a subsidiary of Credito Valtellinese before being absorbed by the parent company in 2016.

== History ==
Cassa di Risparmio di Fano was founded on 14 January 1843 in Fano, the Papal States. Due to Legge Amato, on 28 May 1992, a Società per Azioni (limited company) and a banking foundation (Fondazione Cassa di Risparmio di Fano) were found. In the late 1990s, Banca Popolare di Ancona (BPA) acquired 60% shares of the company, with the foundation and other shareholders retained the remaining stake. In 1996 BPA owned 59.76% shares, its parent company Banca Popolare di Bergamo – Credito Varesino owned 0.29%. It was increased to 66.14% (plus 0.25%) in 1999. In 2002 the remain 33.38% was sold by the foundation for €75 million to BPA. That year BPA owned 99.771% shares, as BP Bergamo transferred their 0.25036% shares to BPA. In 2003 it became part of Banche Popolari Unite.

On 27 July 2005 BPA sold 99.92% shares of Carifano to Banca Intesa (through sub-holding Casse del Centro for buying 30%) and FCM S.p.A. (a special purpose entity for buying 69.92%) for €280 million.

On 3 December 2008 Credito Valtellinese acquired 81.63% shares of Carifano from Intesa Sanpaolo (30%) and from FCM S.p.A. (51.63%) for €382.941 million. It also triggered a public offer to buy the remaining 13.37% shares, as FCM S.p.A. chose to retain 5%. In 2009 Credito Valtellinese owned 94.85% shares. In 2011 increased to 99.73%. On 1 January 2012 the privatization was completed. A new company, Nuova Carifano S.p.A. was also incorporated on 18 April 2011 to receive the assets and liabilities of old Carifano which was absorbed into Credito Valtellinese.

On 20 September 2016 Credito Valtellinese has announced a plan to absorb Carifano again. The legal date was expected on 28 November.

== Banking foundation ==
Fondazione Cassa di Risparmio di Fano was in fact the original statutory corporation of the bank. After a modification of the articles of association, as well as sold the subsidiary entirely from the 1990s to 2002, the foundation became a private legal person, with an aim on charity activities for Fano and surrounding area. The foundation had a shareholders' equity of €117,851,453 at 31 December 2015. The bank was a minority shareholder of Banca delle Marche, Credito Valtellinese, Banca Carim, Cassa Depositi e Prestiti and CDP Reti. The foundation was the owner of San Domenico, as the location to display the arts collection of the organization.

== See also ==
- Art collection of Fondazione Cassa di Risparmio di Fano
- Cassa di Risparmio di Fermo, an Italian bank
- Nuova Banca delle Marche, an Italian bank
- Banca dell'Adriatico, a defunct Intesa Sanpaolo subsidiary
- Banca Popolare di Ancona, a defunct UBI Banca subsidiary
- Cassa di Risparmio di Ascoli Piceno, a defunct subsidiary of Intesa Sanpaolo
- Cassa di Risparmio di Fabriano e Cupramontana, a defunct subsidiary of Veneto Banca
- Cassa di Risparmio di Verona, Vicenza, Belluno e Ancona, predecessor of UniCredit
- List of banks in Italy
