= Banca del Monte di Lombardia =

- Native name: Banca del Monte di Lombardia
- Predecessor: Banca del Monte di Milano; Banca del Monte di Pavia e Bergamo
- Founded: 1987; 1992 (S.p.A. and Fondazione)
- Defunct: 1995 (S.p.A. only)
- Fate: merger
- Successor: Banca Regionale Europea
- Headquarters: Pavia, Italy
- Owner: Fondazione Banca del Monte di Lombardia

Banca del Monte di Lombardia was an Italian regional bank and a charity organization. Due to 1990s banking reform, a S.p.A. and Fondazione Banca del Monte di Lombardia were formed, which the former was merged with another bank in 1995.

== History ==
The bank was formed in 1987 by the merger of Banca del Monte di Milano and Banca del Monte di Pavia e Bergamo. In 1995 the bank merged with Cassa di Risparmio di Cuneo to form Banca Regionale Europea, which later part of Banca Lombarda bank group (Banca Lombarda e Piemontese), the predecessor of UBI Banca.

== Bank Foundation ==
The former owner of the bank, Fondazione Banca del Monte di Lombardia (the bank foundation), was found in 1992 due to Italian banking reform (Legge Amato). In 2000 the foundation sold part of their shares on Banca Regionale Europea, in exchange for the shares of Banca Lombarda e Piemontese. In 2010 the foundation acquired minority interests in Banca Popolare Commercio e Industria, and sold the shares on Banca Regionale Europea.

== See also ==
- List of banks in Italy
