= Banca Popolare Commercio e Industria =

Italian bank

- Formerly: Anonima della Seta
- Company type: subsidiary of a listed company
- Industry: Financial services
- Founded: 1888
- Defunct: 2016
- Fate: absorbed by the parent company
- Headquarters: 33 via Moscova, Milan, Italy
- Area served: Lombardy, Emilia-Romagna, Lazio and Tuscany
- Net income: ▼€35,842,746 (2014)
- Total assets: ▼€9,314,243,576 (2014)
- Total equity: ▼€1,204,580,860 (2014)
- Owner: UBI Banca (83.7631%)
- Parent: UBI Banca
- Capital ratio: 19.11% (Tier 1)

Banca Popolare Commercio e Industria S.p.A. (BPCI) was an Italian bank based in Milan, Lombardy. Found in 1888, the bank absorbed other banks in the 20th century, as well as forming bank group with other banks in the first decade of the 21st century. However, in late 2016 the bank was absorbed by parent company UBI Banca, becoming a defunct brand.

As of 31 December 2014 BPCI had 196 branches, 148 of them in Lombardy, followed by 27 in Emilia-Romagna, 20 in Lazio and 1 in Tuscany.

== History ==
In 2010, Banca Popolare Commercio e Industria sold 87 branches to sister companies, as well as acquired 134 branches. Moreover, Banca Regionale Europea (BRE), formed by a merger of Lombard and Piedmontese bank (Banca del Monte di Lombardia and Cassa di Risparmio di Cuneo), retained only one branch in Lombardy. One of the minority owner of BRE, the banking foundation of Banca del Monte di Lombardia, acquired the shares of BPCI from UBI Banca, at the same time sold all the shares of BRE to UBI Banca. As of 31 December 2010, UBI Banca owned 75.077% shares of BPCI, followed by the banking foundation (16.237%) and Aviva S.p.A. (8.686%). Before the transaction, Aviva held 16.64% and the rest by UBI Banca.

=== Timeline ===
- 1963 Incorporated Cassa San Alessandro di Bergamo
- 1968 Acquired Banca Toljia
- 1977 Incorporated Banca Popolare di Codogno
- 1980 Incorporated Credito Lodigiano
- 1991 Incorporated Banca Popolare di Vigevano
- 1996 Acquired Banca Popolare di Luino e di Varese
- 2001 Acquired Banca Carime
- 2003 merged with Banca Popolare di Bergamo to form Banche Popolari Unite Group
- 2007 Banche Popolari Unite merged with Banca Lombarda e Piemontese to form UBI Banca
- 2010 Internal reorganization with Banca Regionale Europea, Banca Popolare di Bergamo and Banco di Brescia
- 2016 Absorbed by UBI Banca, former headquarter at 33 via Moscova sold to Sericon Investment Fund, managed by Savills Investment Management SGR

== See also ==
- List of banks in Italy
