= Giuseppe Tovini =

Blessed Giuseppe Tovini OFS
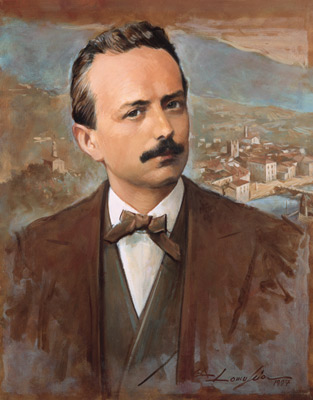
- Born: 14 March 1841; Brescia, Lombardy, Kingdom of Italy (Napoleonic)
- Died: 16 January 1897 (aged 55); Cividate Camuno, Brescia, Kingdom of Italy
- Venerated in: Roman Catholic Church
- Beatified: 20 September 1998, Saint Peter's Square, Vatican City by Pope John Paul II
- Feast: 16 January

Giuseppe Antonio Tovini (14 March 1841 – 16 January 1897) was an Italian banker and lawyer who became a member of the Secular Franciscan Order. He was one of the founder of Banca di Valle Camonica, Banca San Paolo di Brescia and Banco Ambrosiano. His nephew was Mosè Tovini.

He was beatified in 1998 after a miracle was found to have been attributed to his intercession. The cause still continues as it awaits confirmation of another miracle.

== Biography ==
Giuseppe Antonio Tovini was born in 1841 as the first of seven children to Mosè Tovini and Rosa Malaguzzi. He went to high school in Bergamo from 1852 to 1858, and later graduated from the University of Pavia in August 1865. He then moved to Brescia in 1867 to become a lawyer and obtained all the appropriate qualifications to become a lawyer in 1868.

He later married Emilia Corbolani on 6 January 1875 and they went on to have a total of ten children. One son became a Jesuit priest and two daughters became nuns. From 1871 to 1874, Tovini served as the mayor of Cividate Camuno, his birthplace. As mayor, he made important decisions in the life of the city from promoting the establishment of banks to the construction of infrastructure like railway lines.

Tovini also became a member of the Secular Franciscan Order and was among the founders of a Catholic newspaper which published its first edition in 1878 after its founding on 3 April. He founded Banca di Valle Camonica in 1872, Banca San Paolo di Brescia in Brescia in 1888, Banco Ambrosiano in Milan in 1896.

In 1882 he founded Saint Joseph's Kindergarten and he also established other Catholic institutions.

He died in 1897 with a reputation for personal holiness.

== Beatification ==
The cause of beatification was introduced on 14 April 1977 under Pope Paul VI despite the fact that a process had been opened in 1948 and closed in 1957. Another process - a historical commission - continued to investigate the cause from 1992 to 1993 which resulted in the Positio being submitted in 1993 to the Congregation for the Causes of Saints for further evaluation.

Pope John Paul II declared he lived a life of heroic virtue and made him Venerable on 6 April 1995 and approved a miracle attributed to his intercession on 18 December 1997. He was beatified on 20 September 1998.
