= Palazzo del Monte di Pietà (Milan) =

Palazzo del Monte di Pietà (Milano)
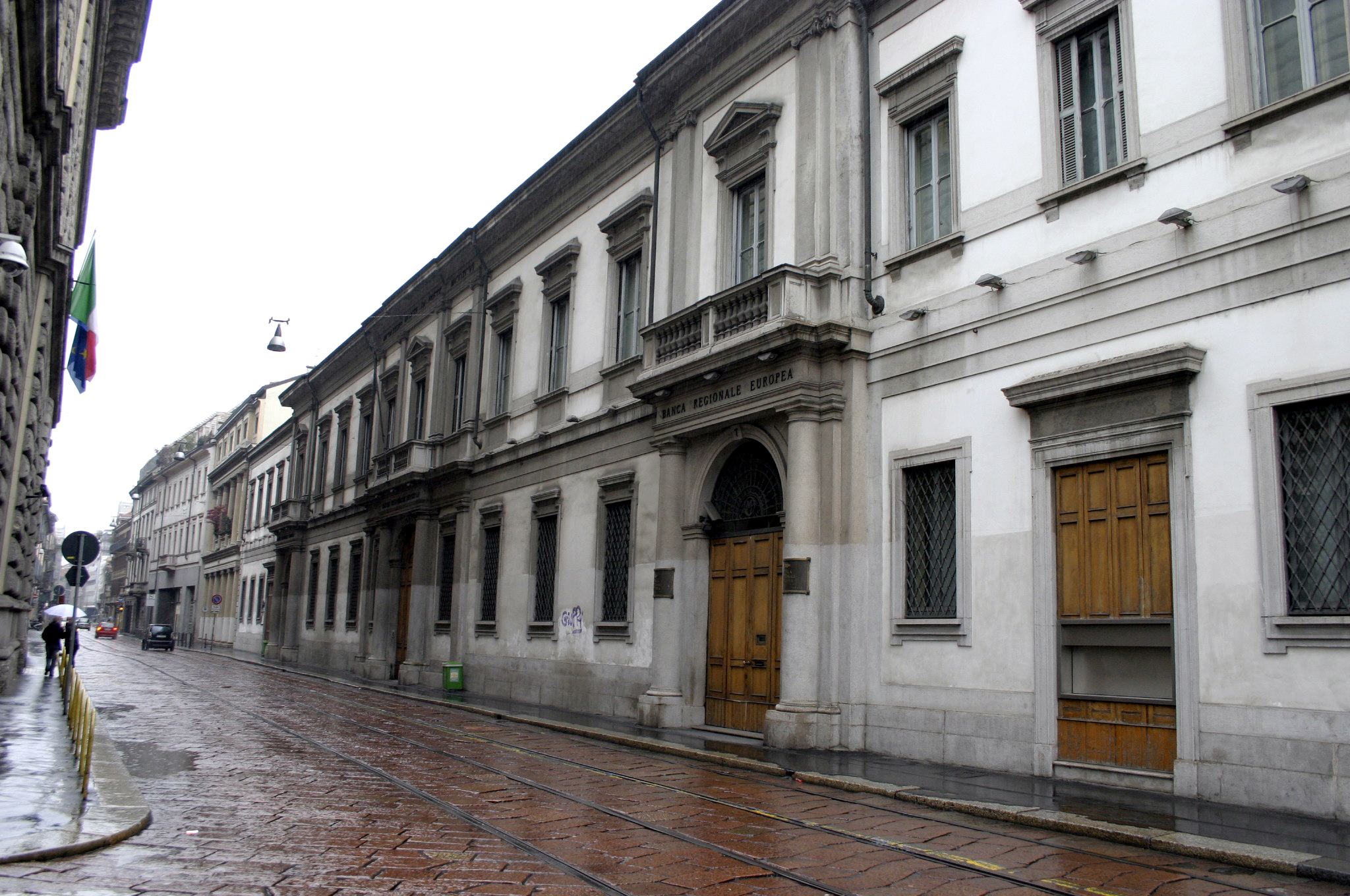
- Piermarini's 18th-century façade
- Interactive map of the Palazzo del Monte di Pietà (Milano) area

General information
- Status: In use
- Type: Palace
- Architectural style: Neoclassical architecture
- Location: Milan, Italy, 5, via Monte di Pietà
- Coordinates: 45.469421°N 9.189567°E
- Construction started: late 15th century

Design and construction
- Architect: Giuseppe Piermarini (refurbishment)

The Palazzo del Monte di Pietà is a 15th-century palazzo in Milan, Italy, adapted in a neoclassical style in the 18th century by Giuseppe Piermarini. Historically belonging to the Sestiere di Porta Nuova, it is located in Via Monte di Pietà no. 5, and was the seat of the Monte di Pietà di Milano.

== History and description ==
The original palace dates back to 1482 when Ludovico il Moro founded the Monte di Pietà of Milan in the then contrada dei Tre Monasteri. Later, of these three monasteries of the toponym, one was incorporated into the remodelling of the palace by the court architect Giuseppe Piermarini in 1782, namely the convent of Santa Chiara, of which a hall with fragments of frescoes remains at the rear of the palace.

The façade, rather simple in the style of early Milanese neoclassicism, has a projecting body in the centre, decorated by a portal bordered by columns supporting the first floor balcony. The piano nobile is punctuated by pilasters of Ionic order.

== See also ==
- Palazzo Marietti
- UBI Banca

== Bibliography ==
=== Italian sources ===
- Attilia Lanza, Marilea Somarè, Milano e i suoi palazzi: porta Vercellina, Comasina e Nuova, Vimercate, Libreria Meravigli editrice, 1993.
- Micaela Pisaroni (1999). Il neoclassicismo. Milano: NodoLibri.
