= Banco di San Giorgio (1987–2012) =

Banco di San Giorgio S.p.A. was an Italian bank that existed from 1987 to 2012. It was named for the historical Bank of Saint George, which has been defunct since 1805. In 1992, it entered the group Credito Agrario Bresciano, initially merged in 1999 with the Banca Lombarda and in 2007 with the UBI Banca Group. On 22 October 2012, it merged with the Banca Regionale Europea (a subsidiary of UBI Banca) that has thus acquired all its branches.

The last chairman of the board of directors was Riccardo Garrone.

== See also ==
- List of banks in Italy
