= Silchester International Investors =

Investment management company

Silchester International Investors LLP
- Company type: Private
- Industry: Financial services
- Predecessor: Silchester Partners Limited
- Headquarters: London, United Kingdom
- Services: equity investment
- Revenue: ▲£169.296 million (2015–16)
- Operating income: ▲£144.097 million (2015–16)
- Total equity: ▼£63.583 million (2015–16)
- Footnotes / references in consolidated financial statement

Silchester International Investors LLP is a London-based investment management company. One of the "designated members" of the limited liability partnership was Silchester Partners Limited until 30 June 2016, which was also the predecessor of the LLP. The other "designated members" were Stephen Charles Butt, Michael John Julian Cowan and Timothy John Linehan. The company had a subsidiary in the US as Silchester International Investors, Inc..

Silchester International Investors made £92.5 million profit (after drawing) in 2015–16 financial year.

The firm is notable for its investments. It prevented TVB's share buy back program, which the program was criticized as a mean to increase the ownership ratio of the majority shareholder, by using TVB's own financial resource.

== Portfolio companies ==
- Asatsu-DK
- Hysan Development (9.10%)
- Nikon (7.13%)
- Tesco Plc (5.1 %)
- Bic (8.47%)
- Aberdeen Group(5.95%)

Banks

- UBI Banca
- Bank of Iwate
- Bank of Yokohama
- Sydbank

Media

- Arnoldo Mondadori Editore
- TVB
- RTL Group

Airlines

- WestJet
