= Fabriano Basket =

Italian professional basketball team

Fabriano Basket was an Italian professional basketball club based in Fabriano, Marche.

Established in 1966, it played in the professional first and second divisions from 1979 to 2008. The side disappeared in June 2008 when it sold its right to play in the then LegaDue to Roseto after struggling to raise financing for the team.

== Notable players ==
2000s

- (Dominican Republic) Luis Flores 1 season: '08
- (United States) Mike Gansey 1 season: '07-'08
- (United States) James Collins 1 season: '06-'07
- (United States) Willie Farley 1 season: '06-'07
- (United States) Brian Oliver 1 season: '05-'06
- (United States) Chris Thomas 1 season: '05-'06
- (Lithuania) Tadas Klimavičius 1 season: '04-'05
- (United States) James Forrest 1 season: '04-'05
- (United States) Drew Nicholas 1 season: '03-'04
- (Spain) Roberto Nunez 1 season: '02-'03
- (United States) DeeAndre Hulett 1 season: '02-'03
- (Canada) Michael Meeks 1 season: '01-'02
- (United States) Tyrone Washington 1 season: '01-'02
- (Latvia) Gundars Vētra 2 seasons: '00-'02

1990s

- (United States) Rodney Monroe 3 seasons: '99-'02
- (The Bahamas) Dexter Cambridge 1 season: '98-'99
- (United Kingdom) Steve Bucknall 1 season: '98-'99
- (United States) Anthony Pelle 1 season: '98-'99
- (United States) Pace Mannion 2 seasons: '97-98, '99-'00
- (United States) Ryan Lorthridge 1 season: '97-'98
- (United States) Michael Young 1 season: '96-'97
- (United States) Eric Anderson 1 season: '96-'97
- (United States) Marcus Stokes 1 season: '95-'96
- (United States) John Turner 3 seasons: '93-'94, '97-'98, '02-'03
- (United States) Bob McAdoo 1 season: '92-'93
- (United States) Jay Murphy 4 seasons: '91-'95
- (United States) Larry Spriggs 2 seasons: '91-'93
- (United States) Carlton McKinney 1 season: '90-'91

1980s

- (Italy) Marco Solfrini 3 seasons: '88-'91
- (Brazil) Israel Machado 5 seasons: '86-'91
- (Brazil) Marcel De Souza 4 seasons: '85-'89
- (United States) Alfredrick Hughes 1 season: '86-'87

== Sponsorship names ==
Throughout the years, due to sponsorship, the club has been known as:

- Honky Wear Fabriano (1979–80)
- Honky Jeans Fabriano (1980–82)
- Honky Fabriano (1982–84)
- A.P. Fabriano (1985–86)
- Alno Fabriano (1986–90)
- Turboair Fabriano (1990–92)
- Teamsystem Fabriano (1992–94)
- Turboair Fabriano (1994–96)
- Faber Fabriano (1996–98)
- Zara Fabriano (1998–99)
- Fabriano Basket (1999-00)
- Banca Marche Fabriano (2000–01)
- Fabriano Basket (2001-02)
- Carifac Fabriano (2002–03)
- Carifabriano Fabriano (2004–06)
