= Cassa di Risparmio di Jesi =

Defunct Italian savings bank

Cassa di Risparmio di Jesi S.p.A.
- Trade name: C.R. Jesi
- Formerly: Cassa di Risparmio in Jesi; Cassa di Risparmio di Jesi
- Type: private
- Industry: Financial services
- Founded: 1844; 1992 (S.p.A.)
- Defunct: 1995 (bank division only)
- Fate: acquired by Banca delle Marche
- Successor: Banca delle Marche; Fondazione CR Jesi
- Headquarters: Jesi, Italy
- Services: Retail banking
Owner
Fondazione CR Jesi	(70%)
Cariplo	(20%)
- Parent: Fondazione CR Jesi

Cassa di Risparmio di Jesi S.p.A. formerly Cassa di Risparmio di Jesi was an Italian savings bank based in Jesi, in the Province of Ancona, the Marche region. The bank had a successor [the] Fondazione Cassa di Risparmio di Jesi which still acted as a local charity organisation.

Cassa di Risparmio di Jesi also issued Miniassegno in the past.

== History ==
The bank was found in 1844 in the Papal States, initially as Cassa di Risparmio in Jesi, a società anonima. The bank later became a private statutory corporation without shareholders. Due to enactment of an Italian law, the bank absorbed some smaller savings bank in Marche. In 1980s, the bank also attempted to absorb bankrupted Cassa di Risparmio di Ancona, but it was acquired by Cassa di Risparmio di Verona, Vicenza e Belluno instead.

In 1992 the bank was spin-off to form a società per azioni (a kind of limited company) and a banking foundation. Lombard bank Cassa di Risparmio delle Provincie Lombarde (Cariplo), a predecessor of Italian major banks Banca Intesa and Intesa Sanpaolo, also subscribed a capital increase of the limited company for 66.67 billion lire (30 billion lire as share capital and the rest as share premium) in the same year. In 1995 the limited company was acquired by Banca delle Marche in an all-share deal. Banca delle Marche itself was founded in 1994 by a merger of to other savings banks of Marche region in Macerata and Pesaro.

== Banking foundation ==
As of 31 December 2012, [the] Fondazione Cassa di Risparmio di Jesi, the successor of the original legal person of the bank, still owned about 10% stake in Banca delle Marche. The foundation subscribed all the capital increase of the bank in order to maintain the ownership ratio. However, it also caused the foundation concentrating its investment on the bank. In 2015, Associazione di Fondazioni e di Casse di Risparmio S.p.A., the trade association of the former savings banks, on behalf with its members, also signed a memorandum of understanding (MoU) with the Ministry of Economy and Finance for the new regulation on the assets of the foundations, which the Fondazione CR Jesi was one of the members of the association which signed the MoU regarding diversify its investment. However, it happened after the failure of Banca delle Marche, which was administrated since 2013.

In November 2015 the shareholders and subordinated bond owner of Banca delle Marche were bail-in to the failure of the bank, with the National Resolution Fund was the sole owner of refounded Nuova Banca delle Marche. The net assets of the foundation decreased from €76,388,622 to €10,989,510 year-to-year, mainly due to the write-off of the value of the shares of [old] Banca delle Marche. Other assets of the foundation included a minority stake in Cassa Depositi e Prestiti for 0.002% [sic] share capital, due to the adjustment of the share capital and the subsequent dilution to the stake that owned by banking foundations, as well as Italian government bond "BTP Italia", etc.

The foundation organised arts exhibition in Marche.

The headquarters of the foundation was located in an ancient building Palazzo Bisaccioni, which was the headquarters of the bank.

== See also ==
- Banca Popolare di Ancona, Italian bank based in Iesi
- List of banks in Italy
