= Banco di Brescia =

Italian bank

Banco di Brescia San Paolo CAB
- Trade name: Banco di Brescia
- Company type: Subsidiary
- Industry: Financial services
- Predecessor: Banca San Paolo di Brescia; Credito Agrario Bresciano
- Founded: 1 January 1999 in Brescia
- Founder: Group Banca Lombarda
- Defunct: 20 February 2017
- Fate: absorbed by the parent company
- Successor: branches of UBI Banca
- Headquarters: Brescia, Italy
Number of locations
Steady	288 branches	(Dec. 2015)
▼	287 branches	(June 2016)
- Area served: Northeast Italy; Lazio, Italy
Key people
Gino Trombi	(hon.chairman)
Costantino Vitali	(chairman)
Pierfrancesco Rampinelli Rota	(VC)
Stefano Vittorio Kuhn	(GM)
Net income
▼	(€11 million)	(2015FY)
▼	(€171 million)	(20161H)
Total assets
▼	€13.545 billion	(Dec. 2015)
Steady	€13.441 billion	(June 2016)
Total equity
▼	€1.388 billion	(Dec. 2015)
▼	€1.216 billion	(June 2016)
- Owner: UBI Banca (100%)
- Parent: UBI Banca
Capital ratio
▲	14.30%	(CET1, Dec. 2015)
▲	14.78%	(CET1, June 2016)
- Website: bancodibrescia.it
- Footnotes / references source

Banco di Brescia San Paolo CAB S.p.A., known as Banco di Brescia, was an Italian bank based in Brescia, Lombardy. On 20 February 2017 it was absorbed into the parent company UBI Banca.

The bank had 288 branches (as of June 2016): 205 in Lombardy, 45 in Lazio, 27 in Veneto, 9 in Friuli – Venezia Giulia and 1 in Trentino – South Tyrol. In the last three regions, Banco di Brescia is the only brand of UBI Banca in that area.

== History ==
In 1998 Banca San Paolo di Brescia and Credito Agrario Bresciano merged to form Group Banca Lombarda. Their subsidiaries, Banca di Valle Camonica and Banco di San Giorgio remained as separate entities. However, the group formed a new brand for the two Brescia based bank, which Banco di Brescia was formed on 1 January 1999. In 2007 it was part of Group UBI Banca, after the banking group acquired Banca Lombarda in an all-share deal.

In 2016, the new business plan of UBI Banca was announced. The banking group no longer use their retail sub-brands in the future, which saw Banco di Brescia was absorbed into UBI Banca on 20 February 2017.

== Sponsorship ==
Banco di Brescia was the sponsor of Brescia Calcio, which the predecessor of the bank, Credito Agrario Bresciano (CAB) also sponsored from 1991 to 1995. The parent company of the bank, Banca Lombarda, was briefly sponsored the football club without featuring the name of the subsidiary from 2001 to 2005.

== See also ==
- Banca Credito Cooperativo di Brescia, a co-operative bank based in Brescia, Italy
- Cassa Padana, a co-operative bank based in the Province of Brescia, Italy
- Banca del Territorio Lombardo, a co-operative bank based in the Province of Brescia, Italy
- Banca Valsabbina, a co-operative bank based in the Province of Brescia, Italy
- Banca Popolare di Brescia, defunct Brescia-based bank
- Bipop Carire, defunct Brescia-based bank
- List of banks in Italy
