= Mosè Tovini =

Blessed Father Mosè Tovini
- Church: Roman Catholic Church

Orders
- Ordination: 9 June 1900 by Giacomo Corna-Pellegrini

Personal details
- Born: Mosè Tovini; 27 December 1877 Cividate Camuno, Brescia, Kingdom of Italy
- Died: January 28, 1930 (aged 52) Brescia, Italy

Sainthood
- Feast day: 28 January
- Venerated in: Roman Catholic Church
- Title as Saint: Blessed
- Beatified: 17 September 2006; Brescia, Italy by Cardinal José Saraiva Martins
- Attributes: Cassock

Blessed Mosè Tovini (27 December 1877 – 28 January 1930) was an Italian Roman Catholic priest and was both the nephew and godson of Blessed Giuseppe Antonio Tovini.

He was beatified on 17 September 2006 in Brescia.

== Biography ==
Mosè Tovini was the eldest of eight children to Eugenio Tovini and Domenica Malaguzzi. His childhood education was spent in Breno and he would later move in with his uncle Giuseppe Antonio Tovini in Brescia at the age of nine in order to continue his studies.

He had his First Communion on 14 November 1886 and felt a religious call to the priesthood at this time. His father opposed his desire to become a priest and enrolled him in high school in Bergamo where he was often bullied. He returned home and his father at last allowed him to follow his religious vocation. He moved back to his uncle and began his studies as a priest in Brescia.

After the death of his uncle in 1897 he left his studies and enlisted in the Italian military where his personal piety had a profound effect on his fellow soldiers. He became a sergeant and was discharged from his duties on 31 October 1898. After this, he returned home and resumed his studies for the priesthood. This led to - at the age of 22 - his ordination on 9 June 1900.

Tovini was sent to Rome to continue his studies and had degrees in mathematics, philosophy and theology by 1904. He returned to Brescia after this where he started teaching at the seminary, and later jointed the Congregation of Oblate Priests. Tovini later travelled to Rome, where he attained a degree in dogmatic theology.

He received an exemption from the draft of World War I and he continued to teach in Brescia. He ministered to the sick during the Spanish flu epidemic and assisted veterans after the war who cut short their studies for the priesthood. He was also made the rector of the seminary in 1926, holding that post for the rest of his life. He continually emphasized a devotion to the Eucharist, the Blessed Virgin Mary and the pontiff as the pillars of a priestly life.

== Beatification ==
Tovini was praised for his holiness and it resulted in calls for his beatification. The formal introduction of his cause for sainthood came on 15 October 1981 and commenced on a diocesan level that spanned from 1981 to 1982. The Positio was submitted to the Congregation for the Causes of Saints in 1995. Pope John Paul II recognized that he had lived a life of heroic virtue and named him to be Venerable on 12 April 2003.

The miracle required for his beatification was investigated on a local level before it was submitted to Rome. Pope Benedict XVI approved the miracle on 19 December 2005 and it led to the beatification on 17 September 2006. One final miracle is required for his canonization.
