= Banca San Paolo di Brescia =

- Native name: Banca San Paolo di Brescia
- Founded: 1888
- Defunct: 1998
- Fate: merger
- Successor: Banca Lombarda Group; Banco di Brescia
- Headquarters: Brescia, Italy

Banca San Paolo di Brescia was an Italian bank based in Brescia, Lombardy. The owner of Banca San Paolo di Brescia and Credito Agrario Bresciano formed a new holding company Banca Lombarda in 1998, as well as merging the two banks into Banco di Brescia on 1 January 1999.

== History ==
Banca San Paolo di Brescia was found in 1888 in Brescia. One of the main founder, Giuseppe Tovini, also participated in the foundation of Banca di Valle Camonica (1872) and Banco Ambrosiano (1896). St. Paul Bank of Brescia acquired Banca di Valle Camonica in 1963.

== See also ==
- List of banks in Italy
