= Palazzo Marietti =

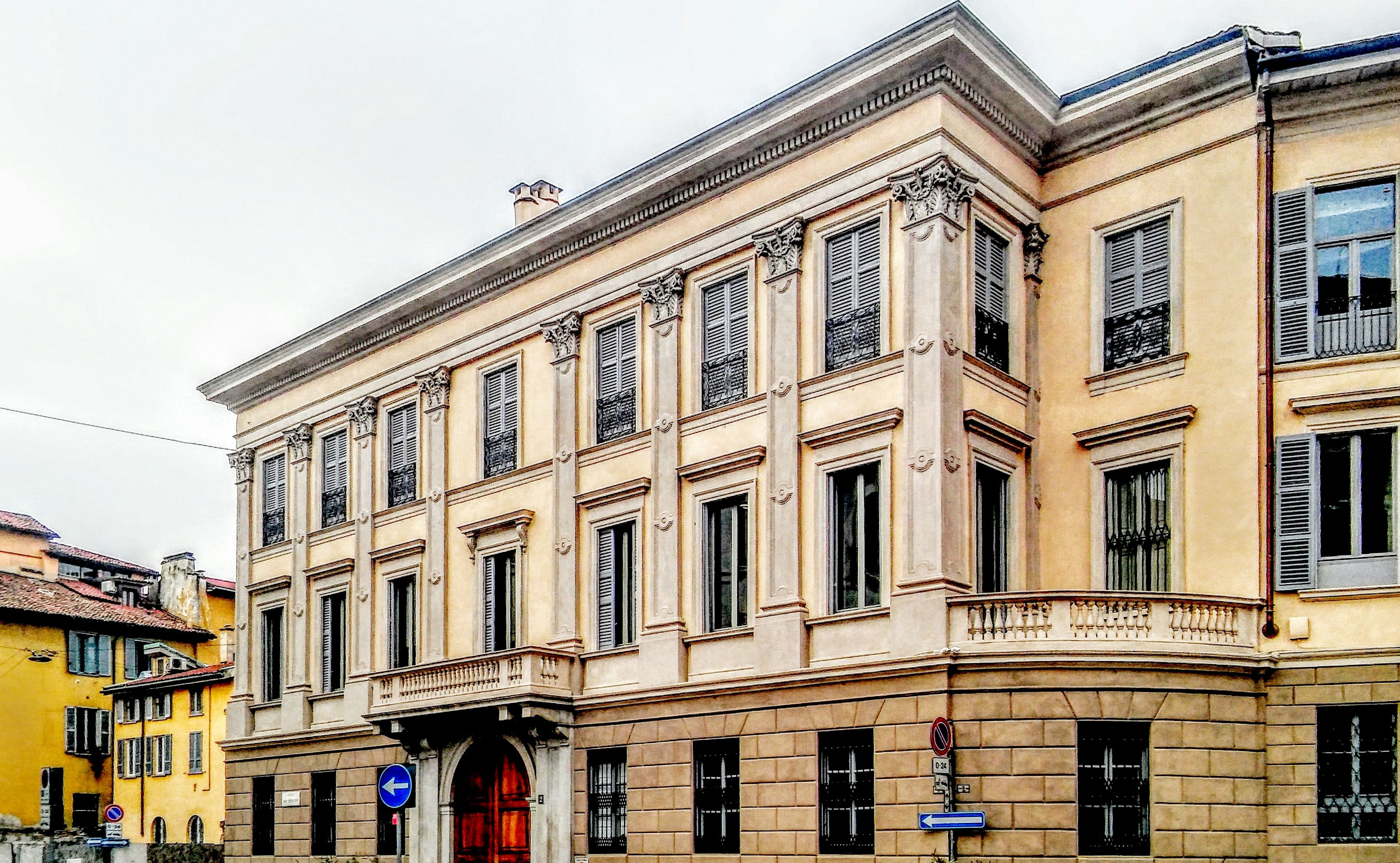
- Facade Palazzo Marietti
- Interactive map of the Palazzo Marietti area

General information
- Status: In use
- Type: Palace
- Architectural style: Neoclassical architecture
- Location: Milan, Italy, 2 via del Bollo
- Coordinates: 45.463084°N 9.184122°E
- Construction started: 15th century (original core)
- Renovated: 19th century

Palazzo Marietti is a historical building in Milan located in Via del Bollo No. 2.

== History and description ==
Although the origin of the palace dates back to the 15th century, the façade was rebuilt in the 19th century with a typically neoclassical appearance: the ground floor has a smooth rusticated ashlar, with a round arch portal enclosed between two pairs of pilasters supporting a balcony. The first and second floors are marked by pilasters of Corinthian order: the main floor has windows decorated with rectilinear mouldings, while the second floor has French windows with simple cornices. Remains of the Renaissance palace can be seen in the portico of Tuscanic order columns, while in the smaller courtyard there are remains of the demolished Milan lazaretto.

== Bibliography ==
=== Italian sources ===
- Paolo Mezzanotte, Giacomo Bascapè, Milano nell'arte e nella storia, Milan, Bestetti, 1968, ISBN not existing.
