= Banca delle Marche =

Italian bank

Banca Adriatica Nuova Banca delle Marche
- Logo in 2017

- Logo 2015–2017, which resemble to the old logo prior 2015
- Trade name: UBI Banca Adriatica; Banca Marche (former)
- Formerly: Banca delle Marche
- Type: subsidiary
- Industry: Financial services
- Predecessor: Cassa di Risparmio della Provincia di Macerata; Cassa di Risparmio di Pesaro; Cassa di Risparmio di Jesi
- Founded: 1994 in Ancona (as Banca delle Marche); 22 November 2015 (refound)
- Defunct: 23 October 2017
- Fate: became UBI Banca branches
- Headquarters: Jesi, Italy (de facto); Bergamo, Italy (registered office)
- Number of locations: ▼293 (2016)
- Area served: Marche (216); Lazio (35); Emilia–Romagna (17); Umbria (13); Abruzzo (12); Molise (former)
- Key people: Osvaldo Ranica (chairman); Alberto Pedroli (CEO)
- Services: Retail and corporate banking
- Net income: €−771.6 million (2016)
- Total assets: ▼€12,207.4 million (2016)
- Total equity: ▼€248.0 million (2016)
- Owner: UBI Banca (100%)
- Number of employees: ▼2,765 (2016)
- Parent: UBI Banca
- Subsidiaries: Cassa di Risparmio di Loreto
- Capital ratio: ▼3.1118% (Group CET1, Dec.2016)
- Website: bancamarche.it

Banca Adriatica S.p.A. trading as UBI Banca Adriatica and formerly known as Nuova Banca delle Marche S.p.A. was an Italian bank based in Jesi, Marche region. It has operations in several regions in central Italy, but concentrated in Marche region, which 73% of the branches were located in that region as of 2016. The bank was formed on 22 November 2015 by the spin off of the good assets of the original Banca delle Marche S.p.A..

Banca delle Marche was formed in 1994 by the merger of the savings banks of Marche region. The bank faced capital shortfall and was nationalized by Italian National Resolution Fund in 2015 as Nuova Banca delle Marche, with toxic assets of the bank was spin off from the new legal person. The bank was bought by UBI Banca on 18 January 2017 for a nominal fee, renaming to Banca Adriatica. In the same year it was merged into UBI Banca.

== Predecessors ==
The history of the bank could be traded back to some savings banks in Marche region in the town of Jesi (found 1844), in the Province of Macerata (found in 1929 by a merger of savings banks of [old] C.R. Macerata (found 1846), C.R. Camerino (found 1844), C.R. Recanati (found 1867) and C.R. Tolentino (found 1873)) and in the town of Pesaro (found in 1841).

== History ==
Banca delle Marche was founded in 1994 by the merging of two banks: Cassa di Risparmio della Provincia di Macerata (C.R. Macerata) and Cassa di Risparmio di Pesaro (C.R. Pesaro); Cassa di Risparmio di Jesi (C.R. Jesi) joined in 1995. In 1990s Cassa di Risparmio delle Provincie Lombarde (Cariplo) was a minority shareholders of the bank for 5.13% (as in 1996), which Cariplo was a minority shareholder of CR Jesi in 1992; Cariplo's stake was diluted to 4.60% in 2001, then the stake was sold by Banca Intesa, the successor of Cariplo to Banca delle Marche as treasury shares in 2002, for €45 million.

In 1997 Banca delle Marche acquired a controlling interest in Cassa di Risparmio di Loreto and Mediocredito Fondiario Centroitalia (Banca Marche owned 41.18% shares before the deal), the pro forma market share of the group in the loan of Marche region, was 26.7% (based on 1996 data), while before the acquisition, the bank already had a market monopoly of 53.6% in the deposits of the Province of Macerata (pro forma 55.0% after the acquisition), comparing to Banca Popolare di Ancona (14%), Banca di Roma (6.38%) and Banca Nazionale del Lavoro (5.60%). The pro forma market share of the deposits in the Province of Ancona was 32.3%, which ahead Banca Popolare di Ancona (13.03%), Unicredito (11.04%) and Banca di Roma (9.78%).

On 1 July 2003 Sanpaolo IMI purchased 7% shares of the bank for €92.1 million. The banking foundations also had a put option to sell an additional 8% shares to Sanpaolo IMI. However, the foundations did not excise the option. In 2007 the shares held by Sanpaolo IMI was transferred to Intesa Sanpaolo after a merger with Banca Intesa. Intesa Sanpaolo did not take part in the capital increase of Banca delle Marche in 2012, making the stake diluted.

=== Insolvency ===
On 24 October 2011, the board of directors proposed a capital increase of a minimum of €180,677,922.70 to a maximum of €212,562,262.00. After the capital increase (of €179,573,391), as at 31 December 2012, the bank had a Tier 1 capital ratio of just 5.62% in consolidated balance sheets, with a shareholders' equity of €959.503 million. According to a ranking by Ricerche e Studi, a subsidiary of Mediobanca, Banca delle Marche was the 19th largest bank in Italy by total assets as at 31 December 2012.

On 15 October 2013 it was under special administration (A.S.) by a decree of the Ministry of Economy and Finance, after a temporary administration by the Bank of Italy in August. On 4 August 2014 Credito Fondiario credited Banca delle Marche for €1.8 billion, which Credito Fondiario also planned to subscribe the new shares of Banca Marche, partnering with Italian deposit insurance fund the Fondo Interbancario di Tutela dei Depositi (FITD). The plan was approved by the Bank of Italy on 3 December 2014. However, the plan was scrapped due to European Commission's investigation on state aid. After Banca Marche failed to repay the loan, Credito Fondiario sold the collaterals in May–June 2015, which fully reimbursed the loan, with an excess amount was return to Banca Marche in June.

Another capital injection of more than €2 billion to Banca Marche, Banca Etruria, Carife, and CariChieti by FITD was planned in late 2015, (€1.2 billion maximum for Banca Marche) subject to the permission from the Bank of Italy and European Central Bank.

Eventually they were bail-out by [Italian] National Resolution Fund (Italian: Fondo Nazionale di Risoluzione) on 22 November instead, for about €3.7 billion in total (€840 million for purchasing new shares of Banca Marche and an additional €1.206 billion to cover the previous loss of Banca Marche). The rescue of the four banks were in line with EU Bank Recovery and Resolution Directive, which was in force in Italy in late 2015. The Bank of Italy was the assigned "national resolution authority" of this mechanism. As the plans were following the directive, they were approved by the European Commission. Banca Marche assets and liabilities would split into good and bad bank, while the old bank would be liquidated, which the shareholders and subordinated bond holders would receive nothing due to bail-in. Among the former shareholders of the bank, as at 31 December 2015 Fondazione Carima had a net assets of €74,227,538, decreased from €154,175,111 year-to-year, while Fondazione CR Pesaro had a net assets of €65,594,243, decreased from €169,830,262 year-to-year. Fondazione CR Jesi suffered the most, which decreased from €76,388,622 to €10,989,510 year-to-year, all majority due to the write-down of the stake of old Banca delle Marche.

On 3 May 2016, Decree-Law No.59/2016 was announced, which the retail investors of the bond of the 4 banks would be refunded (up to €100,000, same as deposit insurance) if they purchased the bond on or before 12 June 2014. The decree-law was a response to the criticism of the bail-in of all junior investors of the bank, which Italian bank often sold risky bond of themselves to their depositors. The refund scheme: Fondo di solidarietà, would be managed by FITD.

=== Nuova Banca Marche / Banca Adriatica ===
On 22 November 2015 the bank was split into a bad and good bank, which the good bank was called Nuova Banca delle Marche. The new bank had a provisional share capital of €1.041 billion and an estimated Tier 1 capital ratio of 9%. While the bad debts were transferred to a single "bad bank" REV - Gestione Crediti, which was shared with Carichieti, Carife and Banca Etruria. The transfer of the bad debt was completed in early 2016.

In March 2016 a plan to absorb Medioleasing into Nuova Banca delle Marche was announced. On 1 August it became effective. Focus Gestioni SGR, the asset management subsidiary of the bank, was also entered voluntary liquidation.

On 12 January 2017, UBI Banca made a binding bid of a nominal €1 for Nuova Banca Marche, Nuova CariChieti and Nuova Banca Etruria. The banking group also requested conditions that the balance sheets of the three banks would be cleaned up before the completion of the deal (which was done by selling NPLs to Atlante II and Credito Fondiario) as well as recapitalized for another €713 million (was estimated €450 million), by the National Resolution Fund. On 18 January the bid was accepted. On 10 May, the transaction was completed, which Nuova Banca Marche was renamed to Banca Adriatica. On the same day, a plan to merge the 3 banks into UBI Banca was also announced.

On 23 October 2017, the merger was completed.

== Shareholders ==
As of 22 November 2015
2001

Shareholders	Stake (% of ordinary shares)
Fondazione Cassa di Risparmio della Provincia di Macerata	21.83%
Fondazione Cassa di Risparmio di Pesaro	21.83%
Fondazione Cassa di Risparmio di Jesi	10.45%
CGNU Holding	5.80%
Commercial Union Italia	2.49%
Banca Intesa	4.60%
others	

2002

Shareholders	Stake (% of ordinary shares)
Fondazione Cassa di Risparmio della Provincia di Macerata	21.83%
Fondazione Cassa di Risparmio di Pesaro	21.83%
Fondazione Cassa di Risparmio di Jesi	10.45%
Aviva Italia Holding	5.80%
Commercial Union Italia	2.49%
others	
Treasury shares	▲4.86%

2003

Shareholders	Stake (% of ordinary shares)
Fondazione Cassa di Risparmio della Provincia di Macerata	▼20.94%
Fondazione Cassa di Risparmio di Pesaro	▼20.94%
Fondazione Cassa di Risparmio di Jesi	▼10.03%
Aviva Italia Holding	5.80%
Commercial Union Italia	2.49%
Sanpaolo IMI	▲7.00%
others	
Treasury shares	▼0.10%

2007

Shareholders	Stake (% of ordinary shares)
Fondazione Cassa di Risparmio della Provincia di Macerata	20.94%
Fondazione Cassa di Risparmio di Pesaro	20.94%
Fondazione Cassa di Risparmio di Jesi	10.03%
Aviva Italia Holding	5.80%
Aviva Italia	2.49%
Intesa Sanpaolo	7.00%
Fondazione Cassa di Risparmio di Fermo	▲0.02%
others	
Treasury shares	▼0.01%

2008

Shareholders	Stake (% of ordinary shares)
Fondazione Cassa di Risparmio della Provincia di Macerata	20.94%
Fondazione Cassa di Risparmio di Pesaro	20.94%
Fondazione Cassa di Risparmio di Jesi	10.03%
Aviva Italia Holding	5.80%
Aviva Italia	2.49%
Intesa Sanpaolo	7.00%
Fondazione Cassa di Risparmio di Fermo	▲0.06%
others	
Treasury shares	▲0.12%

2009

Shareholders	Stake (% of ordinary shares)
Fondazione Cassa di Risparmio della Provincia di Macerata	20.94%
Fondazione Cassa di Risparmio di Pesaro	20.94%
Fondazione Cassa di Risparmio di Jesi	10.03%
Intesa Sanpaolo	7.00%
Aviva Italia Holding	▼3.52%
Aviva Italia	2.49%
Fondazione Cassa di Risparmio di Fano	▲2.30%
Fondazione Cassa di Risparmio di Fermo	0.06%
others	
Treasury shares	▲0.18%

2010

Shareholders	Stake (% of ordinary shares)
Fondazione Cassa di Risparmio della Provincia di Macerata	▲22.40%
Fondazione Cassa di Risparmio di Pesaro	▲22.40%
Fondazione Cassa di Risparmio di Jesi	▲10.73%
Intesa Sanpaolo	7.00%
Fondazione Cassa di Risparmio di Fano	▲3.33%
Fondazione Cassa di Risparmio di Fermo	0.06%
others	
Treasury shares	▲2.59%

2012

Shareholders	Stake (% of ordinary shares)
Fondazione Cassa di Risparmio della Provincia di Macerata	▲22.51%
Fondazione Cassa di Risparmio di Pesaro	▲22.51%
Fondazione Cassa di Risparmio di Jesi	▲10.78%
Intesa Sanpaolo	▼5.84%
Fondazione Cassa di Risparmio di Fano	▲3.35%
Fondazione Cassa di Risparmio di Fermo	▲0.06%
others	
Treasury shares	▲2.89%%

2015–2017

Shareholders	Stake (% of ordinary shares)
Italian National Resolution Fund	100%

2017–

Shareholders	Stake (% of ordinary shares)
UBI Banca	100%

== Subsidiaries ==
Cassa di Risparmio di Loreto, Medioleasing and Focus Gestioni SGR were subsidiaries of the group as at 2014. Mediocredito Fondiario Centroitalia, which was absorbed into Banca delle Marche in 2003, was a merger of Mediocredito delle Marche and Istituto di Credito Fondiario delle Marche, Umbria, Abruzzo e Molise in 1992.

The bank also formed a joint venture company in bancassurance with CGU plc (via subsidiary now known as Aviva Italia Holding) in 1999.

== Sponsorship ==
The bank was a sponsor of sports team Associazione Sportiva Volley Lube and Fabriano Basket; the venue PalaRossini was named after the bank.

== See also ==
- Cassa di Risparmio di Fermo, an Italian bank
- Banca dell'Adriatico, a defunct Intesa Sanpaolo subsidiary
- Banca Popolare di Ancona, a defunct UBI Banca subsidiary
- Cassa di Risparmio di Ascoli Piceno, a defunct subsidiary of Intesa Sanpaolo
- Cassa di Risparmio di Fano, a defunct Credito Valtellinese subsidiary
- Cassa di Risparmio di Fabriano e Cupramontana, a defunct subsidiary of Veneto Banca
- Cassa di Risparmio di Verona, Vicenza, Belluno e Ancona, predecessor of UniCredit
- List of banks in Italy
