= Guglielmo Caffè =

Italian coffee company

Guglielmo Caffè S.p.A.
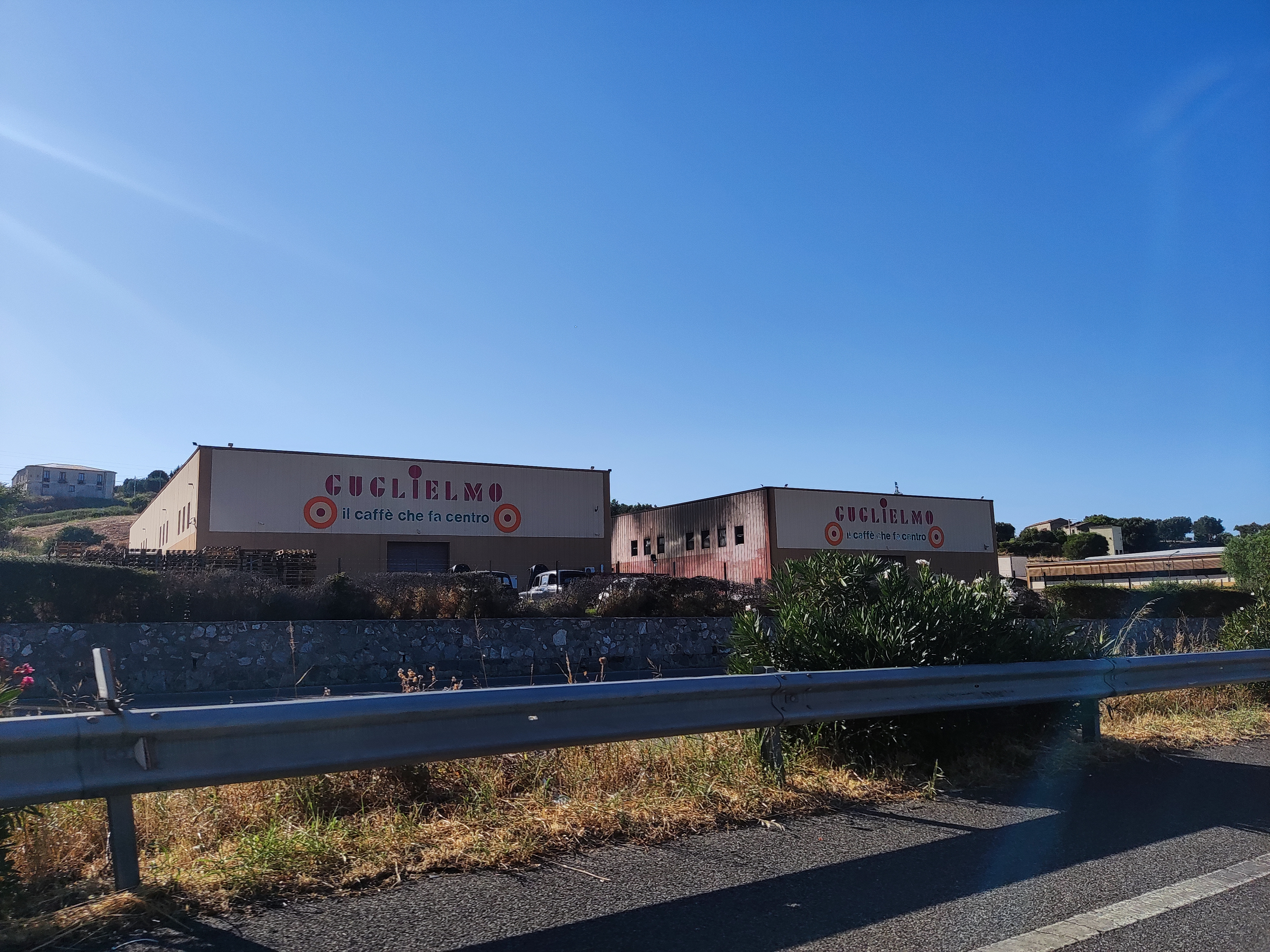
- Company buildings, Copanello
- Company type: S.p.A.
- Industry: Coffee
- Founded: 1943
- Founder: Guglielmo Papaleo
- Headquarters: Copanello di Stalettì, province of Catanzaro, Calabria, Italy
- Area served: Worldwide
- Key people: Volpi Roberto, chairman and Matteo Tubertini Import/Export
- Products: Coffee espresso machines
- Number of employees: 500 approx
- Website: www.GuglielmoCaffe.it

Guglielmo Coffee is an Italian coffee company located in Copanello di Stalettì, Province of Catanzaro, Calabria, Italy. It produces five blends of coffee.

== History ==
=== Origins ===
Guglielmo Papaleo's started his business in 1945. After a short run as clerk in a small foods shop in the capital of Calabria, he opened a shop in "Corso Mazzini", where he put a coffee machine. Two years later, in 1947 he began to produce and sell coffee and to expand the rooms of his shop in order for patrons to try his coffee there.

In 1952 the activity was moved to the quarter "Stratò" of Catanzaro where it targeted the entire country through the use of advertising vehicles the shape of a coffee pot with a cup made from a Fiat 1100. In 1960 there was another move, this time to Catanzaro Sala, in a bigger facility, more suitable for the levels of production that the firm had reached. In 1970, production levels required another move to the present factory at Copanello of Stalettì.

=== Guglielmo S.P.A. incorporates ===
Guglielmo Caffe` becoming a corporation, Guglielmo S.P.A., in 1972. In 1970 Guglielmo Papaleo was appointed "Commendatore della Repubblica" (Knight of the Republic) an honorary state appointed title given to Papaleo for his achievement in the industry. In 1984 Guglielmo's son-in-law, Roberto Volpi, came from Milan and joined the firm. At present R. Volpi is managing director of the firm.

In 1985 the first computer was introduced, making the production automated. In the same year, Guglielmo replaced the old logo displaying the Guglielmo Tell shooting a target with the current image of concentric rings. The company slogan was also changed to "Guglielmo il caffe` che fa centro" ("Guglielmo the coffee that hits the spot").

The company became associated with "Torrefattori Bar" and cooperated with "Sao Caffè". In 1997 Guglielmo Papaleo was appointed "Cavaliere del lavoro" (Knight of the Labor).

In March 1997, the first grandson of Papaleo, Daniele Rossi, was hired by the firm and put in charge of planning and quality control. A year later Matteo Tubertini, a second grandson of Papaleo was introduced to the firm and put in charge of exporting Guglielmo coffee outside the country. Matteo allowed Guglielmo to expand into most of Europe and formed the alliance with their US importer, L'Espresso USA.

=== Infrastructure advances ===
From 1997–present there have been advances in the infrastructure:

- the older roasting machines were replaced with two new ones allowing for a more consistent roast.
- an outside silo (18 meters high, with 14 cells and 3,300 coffee-sack capacity) was installed.
- a new machine to clean green beans more thoroughly was installed.
- a silo for the deposit of the roasted coffee was installed.
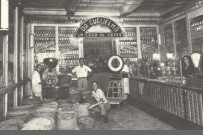

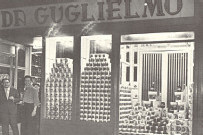

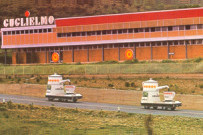

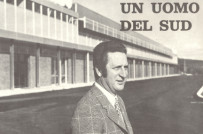

== Production ==
The jacks, containing the "green coffee", are exported from the country of cultivation where there is the phase of toasting. The production of "Guglielmo Caffè", begins with the "green coffee" and has four stages.

1st stage (Introduction of the green coffee): The coffee, from the hopper of the store, is aspirated pneumatically and cleaned from impurities in a separating cyclone. Also pneumatically, it is sent in a silo with ten cells and stored until the next stage.

2nd stage (Roasting): Through the computer system a certain quantity of green coffee is taken away from the silo and put in a toasting machine. Inside those machines, there is a rotating drum that, warmed from a methane furnace, at a temperature of about 240 to 300 degrees Celsius, roasts it. It takes about 15–20 minutes. During this process the physical and chemical characteristics of the beans change. The beans blow up, grow in volume and leave behind the aromatic principles and oils. It is this process that gives coffee its taste and scent. After roasting, the coffee is put in the hopper and cooled down by sending a cold breeze through the airshaft. Through another airshaft the same breeze is recycled to the combustion. The roasting coffee is introduced in one of the two silos through an elevator with cups for the storing.

3rd stage (The blend): Through a computer system, the desired blend is achieved (the combination of arabica and robusta). These different combinations define the different blends of coffee. The choice of the blend depends also on how the coffee will be consumed. After roasting, the coffee is sent to machines for packaging.

4th stage (Vacuum Ground packing): The blend is ground through some mills with rollers, then put in the packets with a technique to preserve the aroma.

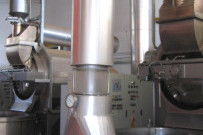

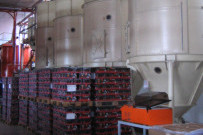

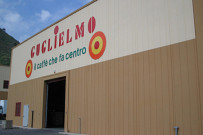

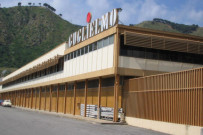

== L'Espresso USA ==
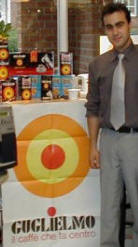
Mimmo Elia President of L'Espresso USA

"L’Espresso USA" was established in 2000, by Mimmo Elia. Based in Boston, Massachusetts, it has five nationwide distributors and several hundred statewide customers.

== Sponsorship ==
- Currently a sponsor for an Italian soccer team: U.S. Catanzaro
- Sponsor for an Italian soccer team: Football Club Crotone (2001/2002)
