= Credito Agrario Bresciano =

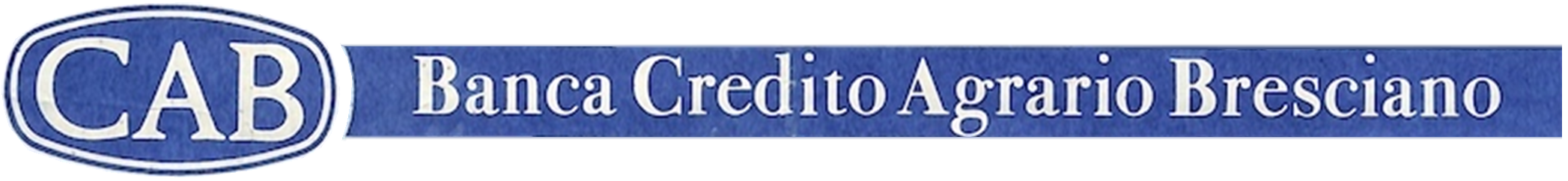
- Native name: Credito Agrario Bresciano
- Company type: Società per azioni
- Industry: Financial services
- Founded: 1883
- Defunct: 1998
- Fate: merger
- Successor: Banca Lombarda Group; Banco di Brescia
- Headquarters: Brescia, Italy
- Services: Retail and corporate banking
- Subsidiaries: Banco di San Giorgio

Credito Agrario Bresciano S.p.A. (CAB) was an Italian bank based in Brescia, Italy.

== History ==
In 1991, CAB acquired Banca Carnica and Banca Zanone. In 1993, CAB acquired GAIC SIM.

In 1998 the bank merged with Banca San Paolo di Brescia to form Banca Lombarda Group. More specifically, Banco di San Giorgio, a subsidiary of CAB, remained as a separate entity, while the former branches of CAB and Banca San Paolo di Brescia were merged into Banco di Brescia on 1 January 1999.

== See also ==
- List of banks in Italy
