= Stalettì =

- Comune
- Comune di Stalettì
- Location within Italy Location within Calabria
- Coordinates: 38°45′55″N 16°32′20″E
- Country: Italy
- Region: Calabria
- Province: Catanzaro (CZ)
- Frazioni: Santa Maria del Mare, Torrazzo, Copanello, Caminia, Pietragrande

Area
  - Total: 11 km^{2} (4.2 sq mi)
- Elevation: 382 m (1,253 ft)

Population (31 December 2013)
  - Total: 2,486
  - Density: 230/km^{2} (590/sq mi)
- Demonym: Stalettesi
- Time zone: UTC+1 (CET)
  - Summer (DST): UTC+2 (CEST)
- Postal code: 88069
- Dialing code: 0961
- Patron saint: San Gregorio
- Saint day: 17 November
- Website: Official website

Stalettì is a town and comune in the province of Catanzaro in the Calabria region of southern Italy.

== Geography ==
The town is bordered by Montauro and Squillace. It’s landscape includes beaches in the Caminia, Copanello, and Pietragrande frazioni, along with hills and mountains.

There are many farms, as well, with the predominant export being olives and olive oil.

There is limited road access connecting the upper and lower sections of Stalettì, and it has rendered difficult particularly in moments of need, such as fires and other emergencies.

== Notes and references ==
Guida storico-turistica di Stalettì by Rosario Casalenuovo (Archeoclub d'Italia, Rome 1996)

- Il monastero Vivariense di Cassiodoro: ricognizione e ricerche, 1994-1999
