= Banca di Valle Camonica =

Italian bank

- Native name: Banca di Valle Camonica S.p.A.
- Company type: Società per Azioni
- Headquarters: 2 Piazza Repubblica, Breno, Italy
- Net income: ▲€1,902,307 (2014)
- Total assets: ▼€1,911,456,064 (2014)
- Total equity: ▲€145,425,275 (2014)
- Owner: UBI Banca (84.13%); Cattolica Assicurazioni (5.5%)
- Parent: UBI Banca
- Capital ratio: ▲11.61% (Tier 1)

Banca di Valle Camonica S.p.A. was an Italian bank based in Breno, in the Province of Brescia, Lombardy. The bank is named after Val Camonica. The Bank offers saving products, life insurance, corporate finance, and prepaid cards. Banca di Valle Camonica serves customers in Italy.

== History ==
Founded in 1872, Banca di Valle Camonica was a subsidiary of Banca San Paolo di Brescia since 1963. The parent company merged with Credito Agrario Bresciano to form Banca Lombarda Group. In 2007, the bank became part of UBI Banca.

== See also ==
- List of banks in Italy
