= Walter Nicoletti =

Italian footballer and manager (1952–2019)

Personal information
- Date of birth: 4 November 1952
- Place of birth: Santarcangelo di Romagna, Italy
- Date of death: 23 September 2019 (aged 66)
- Place of death: Rimini, Italy
- Position: Goalkeeper

Youth career
- Years: Team
- Cesena

Managerial career
- 1978–1979: San Mauro
- 1979–1980: Savignano
- 1980–1981: Corpolo
- 1981–1985: Santarcangelo
- 1985–1990: Vis Pesaro
- 1989–1990: Giarre
- 1990–1992: Taranto
- 1992–1993: Empoli
- 1993–1994: Pisa
- 1995–1996: Trapani
- 1996–1998: Gualdo
- 1998–1999: Livorno
- 1999–2000: Cesena
- 2000–2002: Pistoiese
- 2002–2003: Spezia
- 2004–2005: Lucchese
- 2004–2005: S.P.A.L.
- 2007–2008: San Marino Calcio

Walter Nicoletti (4 November 1952 – 23 September 2019) was an Italian professional football coach.

== Career ==
Born in Santarcangelo di Romagna, Nicoletti was originally a teacher, having previously been a youth player at Cesena, where he played as a goalkeeper.

Nicoletti began his coaching career in the 1970s, initially managing Emilia-Romagna-based San Mauro, Savignano and Corpolo. In 1985, Nicoletti joined Vis Pesaro, staying with the club for four years. Nicoletti later managed Giarre, Taranto, Empoli, Pisa, Trapani, Gualdo, Livorno, Cesena, Pistoiese, Lucchese, Spezia and S.P.A.L. After retiring as a coach he became a professor and advisor to the Italian Football Coaches Association.
