= Banca Lombarda e Piemontese =

- Native name: Banca Lombarda e Piemontese
- Predecessor: Banca San Paolo di Brescia; Credito Agrario Bresciano
- Founded: 1998
- Defunct: 2007
- Successor: UBI Banca
- Headquarters: Brescia, Italy

Banca Lombarda e Piemontese was an Italian banking group. It was formed as Banca Lombarda in 1998 by the merger of Banca San Paolo di Brescia (with subsidiary Banca di Valle Camonica) and Credito Agrario Bresciano (with subsidiary Banco di San Giorgio). The group merged with Banca Regionale Europea in 2000, which changed their name to reflect the extension to Piedmont region. In 2007 the group merged with Banche Popolari Unite to form UBI Banca.

The group was a minority shareholders of Banca Intesa, partly due to the sales of Cariparma's shares to Banca Intesa and partially due to the warrants issued to Banca San Paolo di Brescia.

== The Group ==
The Parent Bank centralized the governance functions, while other activities were carried out by the other banks and companies belonging to the Group:

- Banco di Brescia (has been operational since January 1, 1999 with the transfer of the Banca Lombarda branches)
- Banca di Valle Camonica (established on June 2, 1872)
- Banco di San Giorgio (incorporated in 1987, since December 2, 1992 it was part of the CAB-Credito Agrario Bresciano Banking Group)
- Banca Regionale Europea (established in 1995, following the merger of Cassa di Risparmio di Cuneo and Banca del Monte di Lombardia)
- Cassa di Risparmio di Tortona (since 1999 with the transfer of 60 percent of the capital from the Fondazione Cassa di Risparmio di Tortona to the Banca Lombarda Group)
- Banca Lombarda Private Investment (operates in the private banking sector)

== Former subsidiaries ==
- Banco di Brescia
- Banca di Valle Camonica
- Banco di San Giorgio
- Banca Regionale Europea acquired in 2000
- Cassa di Risparmio di Tortona acquired in 1999
- Banca Lombarda Private Investment
- Banca della Valle d'Aosta minority interests

== See also ==
- List of banks in Italy
