= Banca Popolare di Bergamo =

- Native name: Banca Popolare di Bergamo S.p.A.
- Formerly: Banca Popolare di Bergamo – CV
- Company type: subsidiary of a listed company
- Founded: 1869 in Bergamo
- Headquarters: 8 Piazza Vittorio Veneto, Bergamo, Italy
- Net income: ▲€143,568,972 (2014)
- Total assets: ▼€21,379,426,705 (2014)
- Total equity: ▲€2,332,026,750 (2014)
- Owner: UBI Banca (100%)
- Parent: UBI Banca
- Capital ratio: ▼17.53% (Tier 1)
- Website: Official website

Banca Popolare di Bergamo S.p.A. is an Italian bank based in Bergamo, Lombardy. The bank is a wholly owned subsidiary of UBI Banca.

== History ==
Banca Popolare di Bergamo was found in 1869.

=== Banca Popolare di Bergamo Group ===
In 1992, the bank merged with Credito Varesino which the bank was renamed as Banca Popolare di Bergamo – Credito Varesino. It was the first cooperative bank listed in Borsa Italiana. It also acquired Banca Popolare di Ancona as its subsidiary.

=== Banca Popolare di Bergamo (subsidiary) ===
In 2003, the bank merged with Banca Popolare Commercio e Industria to form Banche Popolari Unite. The retail network of BP Bergamo was also re-incorporated as a new limited company (S.p.A., P.I.03034840169), while the parent company, BPU, remained as a cooperative society . In 2007, the bank became part of UBI Banca.

== See also ==
- List of banks in Italy
