= UBI Banca =

Italian banking group

Unione di Banche Italiane S.p.A.

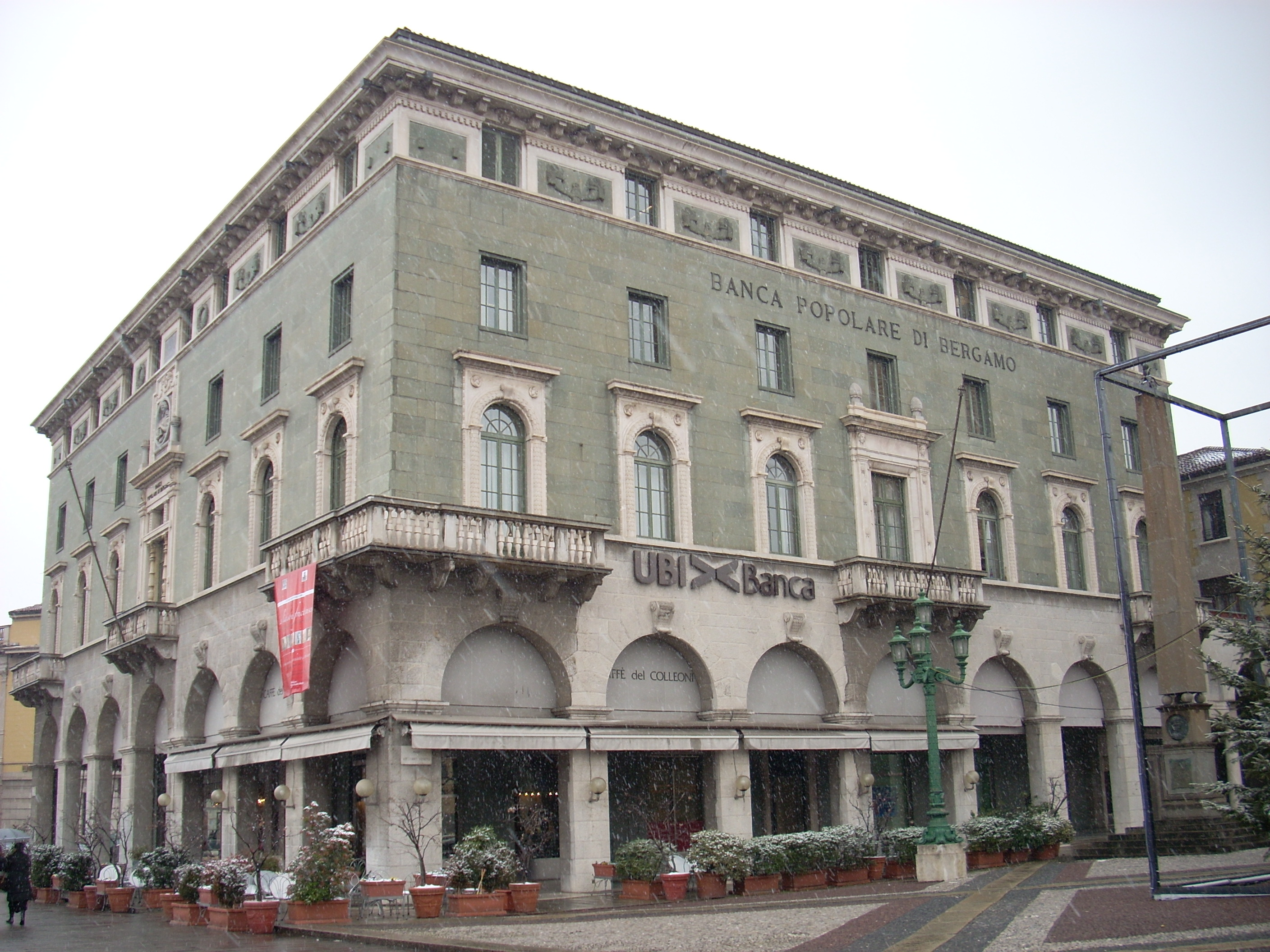
- Trade name: UBI Banca
- Company type: Subsidiary
- Industry: Financial services
- Predecessor: Banche Popolari Unite
- Founded: 1 April 2007; 19 years ago
- Defunct: 12 April 2021; 5 years ago
- Fate: Acquired by Intesa Sanpaolo
- Headquarters: Bergamo, Italy (registered office); Brescia, Italy (second office)
- Number of locations: ▼1,812 branches in Italy (June 2018)
- Key people: Andrea Moltrasio (chairman of supervisory board); Letizia Moratti (chairwoman of management board); Victor Massiah (CEO)
- Services: Retail banking; Corporate banking; Asset management; Leasing and factoring
- Net income: ▼€691 million (2017)
- Total assets: ▲€127.37 billion (2017)
- Total equity: ▲€9.23 billion (2017)
- Number of employees: ▼21,414 (2017)
- Parent: Intesa Sanpaolo
- Capital ratio: ▲11.56% (CET1)
- Rating: Moody's
- Website: ubibanca.it
- Footnotes / references UBI Banca's 2017 consolidated financial statement

Unione di Banche Italiane S.p.A., commonly known for its trading name UBI Banca, was an Italian banking group, the fifth largest in Italy by number of branches. It was formed on 1 April 2007 from the merger of the Banche Popolari Unite (trading as BPU Banca) and Banca Lombarda e Piemontese banking groups.

UBI Banca shares were listed on the Borsa Italiana and included in the FTSE MIB (the blue chip index) until it was taken over by its larger Italian rival Intesa Sanpaolo in September 2020.

== History ==
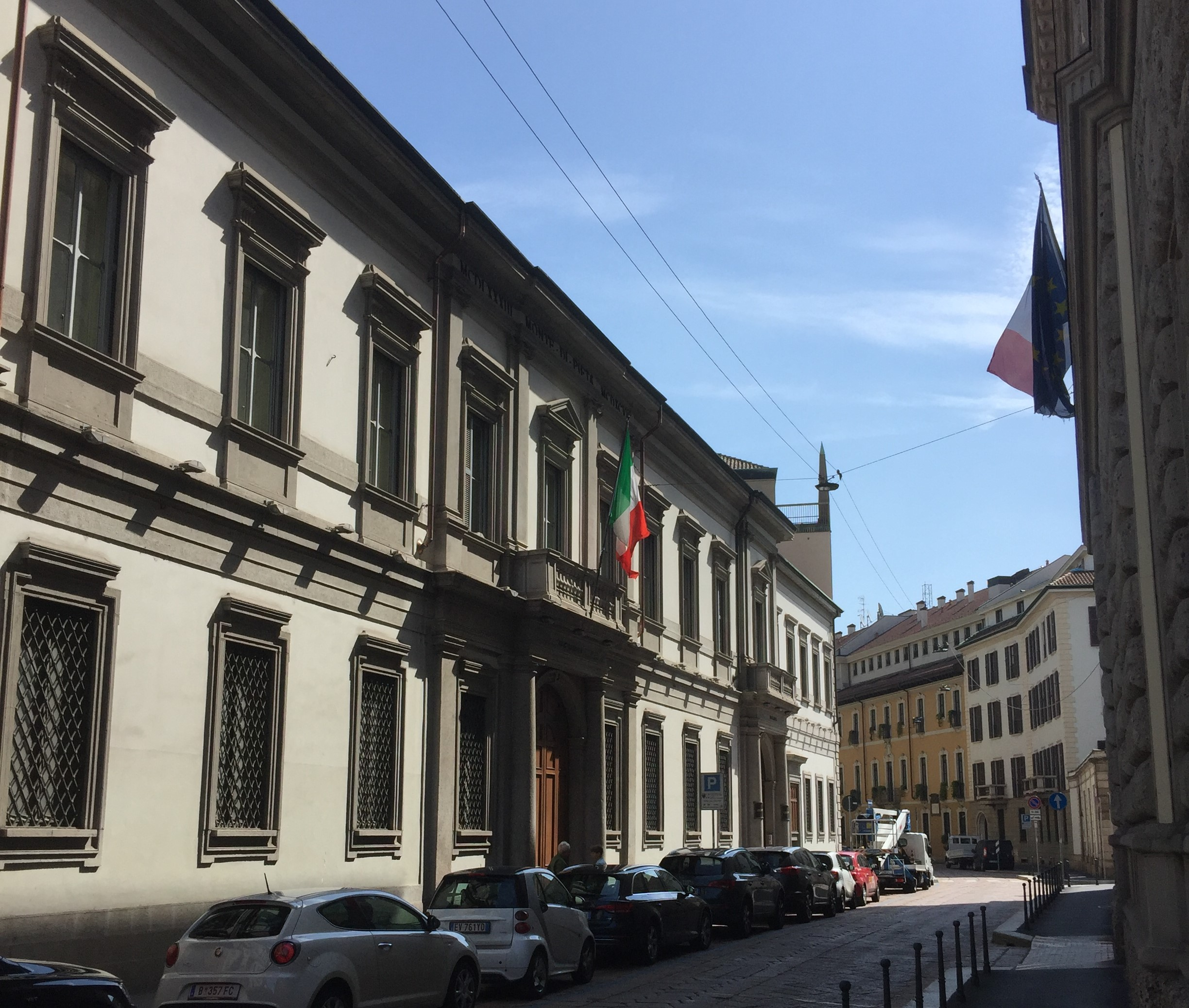
Palazzo del Monte di Pietà in Milan, former local office of UBI Banca

=== Banche Popolari Unite ===
Banche Popolari Unite, trading as BPU Banca, was formed by the merger of Banca Popolare di Bergamo – Credito Varesino Group with Banca Popolare Commercio e Industria Group, both Popular Bank (Italian: Banca Popolare), a kind of urban co-operative bank in Italy, in 2003. Their subsidiaries at that time were Banca Popolare di Ancona, Cassa di Risparmio di Fano (Carifano), Banca Popolare di Luino e di Varese and Banca Carime. Although the two groups merged, Banca Popolare di Bergamo and Banca Popolare Commercio e Industria were re-incorporated as a subsidiary in the form of società per azioni.

Carifano was sold back to the minority shareholders of Banca Popolare di Ancona in 2005.

In 2006 the board of directors of Banche Popolari Unite agreed another merger with another Italian banking group Banca Lombarda.

=== Unione di Banche Italiane ===
The UBI Banca Group was formed on 1 April 2007 from the merger of the BPU Banca Group and the Banca Lombarda Group. The Group operates mainly on the retail market and is present in most regions of Italy, although its focus is primarily on northern Italy. The parent company has its headquarters in Bergamo.

On 20 January 2015 the Council of Ministers issued a decree-law which requires Popular Banks (Italian: Banca Popolari) with assets of greater than €8 billion to demutualize into a società per azioni. In the same year UBI Banca was demutualized.

On 27 June 2016, the business plan for 2019–20 was announced. The subsidiaries Banca Popolare di Bergamo, Banco di Brescia, Banca Popolare Commercio e Industria, Banca Regionale Europea, Banca Popolare di Ancona, Banca Carime and Banca di Valle Camonica would be absorbed by parent company UBI Banca in 2016–17.

On 12 January 2017 UBI Banca submitted a binding bid of €1 to buy Nuova Banca delle Marche, Nuova Banca dell'Etruria e del Lazio and Nuova Cassa di Risparmio di Chieti (the three banks that were rescued on 22 November 2015 by Italian National Resolution Fund, a fund that was mandatory contributed by the banking sector, and was managed by the Bank of Italy), with conditions that the three banks would be recapitalized for an estimated €450 million by the fund, as well as selling some of the target banks' non-performing loans (NPLs) to lower the size of their risk-weighted assets to below €10.6 billion, increase coverage ratio for the NPLs (i.e. more write down and provision), and a minimum of CET1 ratio of 9.1%. UBI Banca would also recapitalized for a maximum of €400 million to counter-weight the effect of bad will (negative goodwill). On 18 January the bid was accepted and signing the contract. On 10 May, the transaction was completed. On the same day, a plan to merge the 3 banks into UBI Banca was also announced. In June 2017, about 167 million new shares were offered to the existing shareholders for €2.395 each (a discount compared to market value), to raise aforementioned €400 million for the completion of the acquisition of the 3 banks.

=== Acquisition by Intesa Sanpaolo ===
On 17 February 2020, Carlo Messina, CEO of Intesa Sanpaolo, unexpectedly announced the launch of a voluntary public exchange offer for 4.9 billion euro towards UBI Banca. The initial proposal provided that for every ten shares of UBI Banca, seventeen newly issued Intesa Sanpaolo shares will be paid with a premium of 27.6% compared to the listing on the Stock Exchange on Friday 14 February 2020 (ex-dividend). Furthermore, on 27 April 2020, Intesa Sanpaolo, which with the success of the transaction gains access to three million UBI customers, submitted to the extraordinary shareholders' meeting the proposal for a capital increase in support of the voluntary public exchange offer, with a favorable vote of the same.

== Group structure ==
The group is composed of the following companies: :

- an internet bank that specialises in the management of individual and family investments, IWBank Private Investments
- companies which operate in the following:
  - salary-backed personal loans: Prestitalia
  - asset management: UBI Pramerica
  - factoring: UBI Factor
  - leasing: UBI Leasing
- one service company: UBI Sistemi e Servizi (UBISS)
- minority interests/joint venture
  - Lombarda Vita, an insurance company
  - Aviva Vita, an insurance company

== Geographic distribution ==
Despite one of the 5 largest banks of Italy by total assets, As of 2015, the banking network of UBI Banca was only concentrated in the regions which member banks were came from. For example, a market share of over 15% in Calabria (Banca Carime), between 5 and 15% in Apulia, Basilicata, Campania (Banca Carime and Banca Popolare di Ancona), Marche (Banca Popolare di Ancona), Lombardy (ranked second: Banco di Brescia, Banca Popolare di Bergamo, Banca Popolare Commercio e Industria and Banca di Valle Camonica), Piedmont and Liguria (Banca Regionale Europea). Market share in other regions were below 5% or even below 2%.

== Governance ==
UBI Banca has adopted a two tier governance system with two boards, a supervisory board and a management board. (pursuant to articles 2409g and following of the Italian Civil Code)

== Shareholders ==
Article 120 of the consolidated finance law states that persons holding more than 3% of the share capital in a share issuer which has Italy as its member state of origin must notify this to the company and to the Consob (Italian securities market authority).

On the basis of Consob (Italian securities market authority) communications, on 7 February 2017 the following investors possessed shareholdings of greater than 2%:

- Fondazione Cassa di Risparmio di Cuneo (5.910%)
- Fondazione Banca del Monte di Lombardia (5.208%)
- Silchester International Investors (5.123%)

The two banking foundations gained part of their shares due to 2017 absorption of Banca Popolare Commercio e Industria and Banca Regionale Europea into UBI Banca.

=== Shareholders' agreement ===
Some of the shareholders also signed shareholders' agreements, represented 17.04% voting rights in 2016.

As at 14 March 2017, "Patto dei Mille" represented 3.001% shares, while rival syndicate "Sindacato Azionisti UBI Banca SpA" represented 13.64% shares; Fondazione Banca del Monte di Lombardia, Fondazione Cassa di Risparmio di Trento e Rovereto and Cattolica Assicurazioni belongs to "Sindacato Azionisti UBI Banca SpA".

The shareholders' agreement made the syndicate was the largest shareholder, followed by Fondazione Cassa di Risparmio di Cuneo and Silchester International Investors.

== Sponsorship ==
UBI Banca, via Banco di Brescia, was the main sponsor of football club Brescia Calcio. After all banking subsidiaries/brands became defunct, UBI Banca was the main sponsor of the reserve team of Bergamo-based Atalanta B.C., as well as the "official bank" of the whole club. The contract with Brescia was also extended, which UBI Banca itself became the main sponsor.
