= Cassa di Risparmio di Fabriano e Cupramontana =

Carifac
- Company type: subsidiary of a public company
- Industry: Financial services
- Founded: late 19th century
- Defunct: 2013
- Headquarters: Fabriano, Marche, Italy
- Products: retail banking
- Owner: Intesa Sanpaolo
- Parent: Intesa Sanpaolo

Cassa di Risparmio di Fabriano e Cupramontana S.p.A. known as Carifac, is a former Italian regional retail bank, before owned by Veneto Banca and now by Intesa Sanpaolo.

== History ==
The bank was owned by a philanthropic organization: Fondazione Cassa di Risparmio di Fabriano e Cupramontana (Fondazione Carifac) but acquired by and absorbed into Veneto Banca in the 2010s. Cattolica Assicurazioni was a minority owner for 17.33% in 2005.

== Sponsorship ==
Carifac was a sponsor of Fabriano Basket.

== Bank Foundation ==
Fondazione Cassa di Risparmio di Fabriano e Cupramontana or Fondazione Carifac held 561,603 shares of Veneto Banca as of 31 December 2014.
