= Banca Popolare di Ancona =

- Native name: Banca Popolare di Ancona
- Formerly: Banca Popolare Cooperativa di Jesi
- Company type: subsidiary of a listed company
- Industry: Financial services
- Founded: 1891 in Jesi
- Headquarters: 4 via Don A. Battistoni, Jesi, Italy
- Net income: ▲€7.817 million (2014)
- Total assets: ▼€8.604 billion (2014)
- Total equity: ▲€875,556,787 (2014)
- Owner: UBI Banca (99.53%)
- Parent: UBI Banca
- Capital ratio: ▼14.67% (Tier 1)

Banca Popolare di Ancona S.p.A. is an Italian bank based in Jesi, in the Province of Ancona, Marche. it is a subsidiary of UBI Banca.

== History ==
The former cooperative bank was found in 1891 in Jesi as Banca Popolare Cooperativa di Jesi. In 1956 the bank incorporated Banca Operaia di Cupramontana. From 1964 to 1970 acquired Banca Popolare di Osimo, Banca Popolare di Montemarciano, Banco di Sconto e Deposito di Castelfidardo and Banca Popolare di Senigallia. In 1976–77 acquired Banca Popolari di Sarnano, San Ginesio Camerino e Potenza Picena.

In 1980s the bank acquired Banca Popolare del Montefeltro e del Metauro, Banca Tiburtina di Credito e Servizi, and Banca Popolare Nicolò Monforte. In 1993 Cassa Rurale ed Artigiana di Benevento and 1995 Banca di Credito Cooperativo S.Giorgio La Molara.

In 1995, the bank changed the name into Banca Popolare di Ancona S.c.r.l.. In the late 1990s, the bank became part of Banca Popolare di Bergamo Group. The bank became a Società per Azioni (limited company) from cooperative society. It acquired Banca Popolare di Napoli, Banca Popolare di Todi, Cassa di Risparmio di Fano, Banca Popolare Campana and Banca Frentana di Credito Cooperativo di Lanciano.

In 2003, the bank became part of Banche Popolari Unite Group. In 2007 it became part of UBI Banca. In 2015 the parent company also became a S.p.A. due to Decree-Law N°3 of 2015.

== See also ==
- Banca dell'Adriatico, a subsidiary of Intesa Sanpaolo, former "Banca Popolare" of the region
- Nuova Banca delle Marche, a successor of Cassa di Risparmio di Jesi
- Cassa di Risparmio di Verona, Vicenza, Belluno e Ancona, a predecessor of UniCredit
- List of banks in Italy
