= Lloyds Bank =

British retail and commercial bank

Lloyds Bank plc
- Logo used since 2024

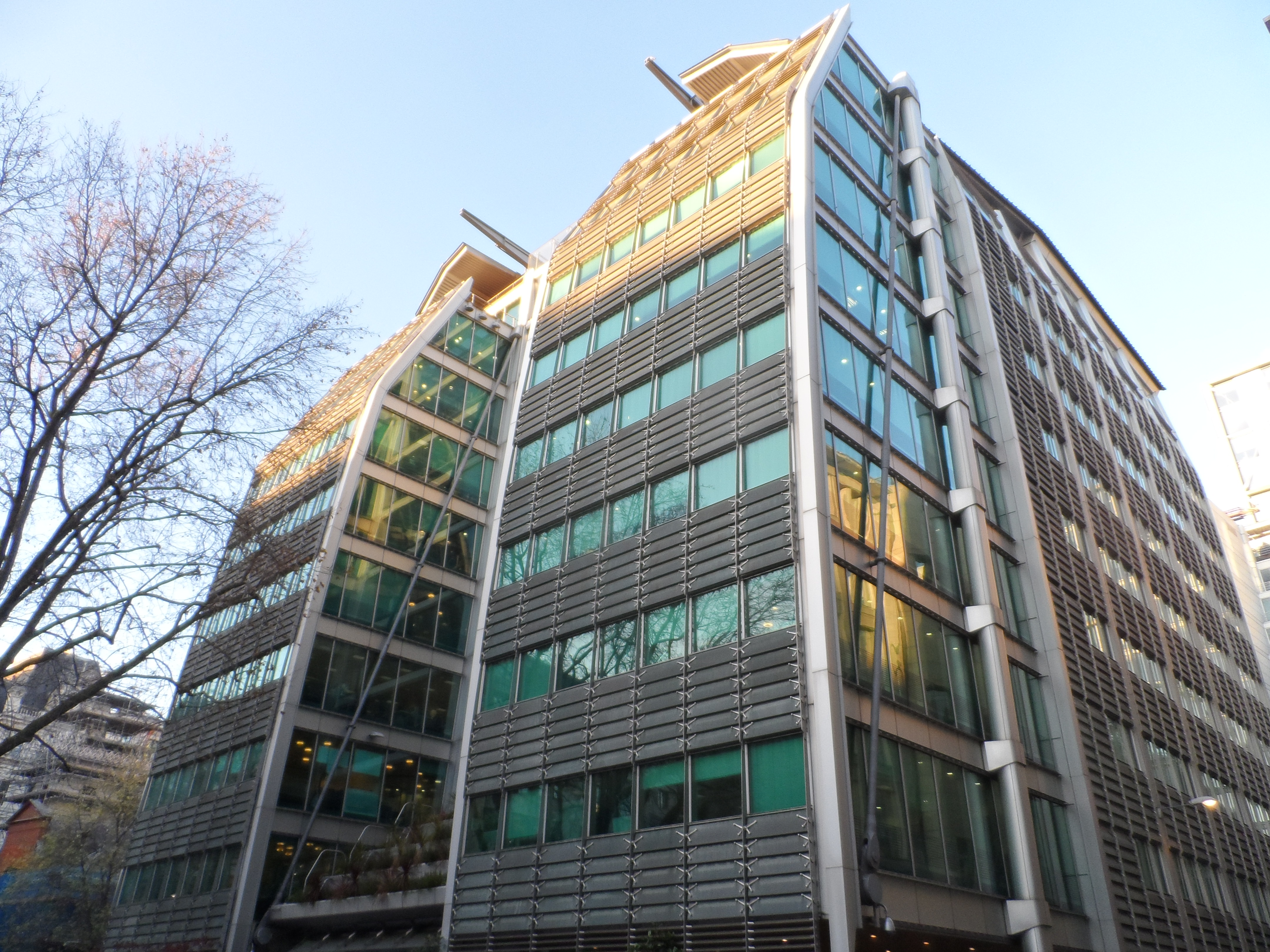
- 25 Gresham Street, London
- Formerly: Lloyds Banking Company Limited (1865–1884); Lloyds, Barnetts, and Bosanquets Bank Limited (1884–1889); Lloyds Bank Limited (1889–1981); Lloyds Bank plc (1981–1999); Lloyds TSB Bank plc (1999–2013)
- Type: Public
- Industry: Financial services
- Founded: 3 June 1765; 261 years ago (Taylors and Lloyds)
- Founders: John Taylor; Sampson Lloyd
- Headquarters: London, England, UK
- Key people: Robin Budenberg (chairman); Charlie Nunn (CEO)
- Products: Banking and insurance
- Operating income: £20.5 billion (2016)
- Net income: £16.6 billion (2016)
- Total assets: £436 billion (2016, average interest-earning banking assets)
- Number of employees: 45,856
- Parent: Lloyds Banking Group
- Subsidiaries: Lloyds Bank International Limited; Lloyds Bank (Gibraltar) Limited
- Website: lloydsbank.com

Lloyds Bank plc is a major British retail and commercial bank with a significant presence across England and Wales. It has traditionally been regarded one of the "Big Four" clearing banks.

Established in Birmingham in 1765, Lloyds Bank expanded considerably during the 19th and 20th centuries, acquiring several smaller banks along the way. It merged with the Trustee Savings Bank in 1995 and operated as Lloyds TSB Bank plc from 1999 to 2013. In January 2009, it became a key subsidiary of Lloyds Banking Group following the acquisition of HBOS by Lloyds TSB Group. The bank's operational headquarters are in London, England, with additional offices in Wales and Scotland, and it also manages office complexes, brand headquarters, and data centres in Birmingham, Leeds, Sheffield, Halifax, and Wolverhampton.

== History ==
=== Origins ===
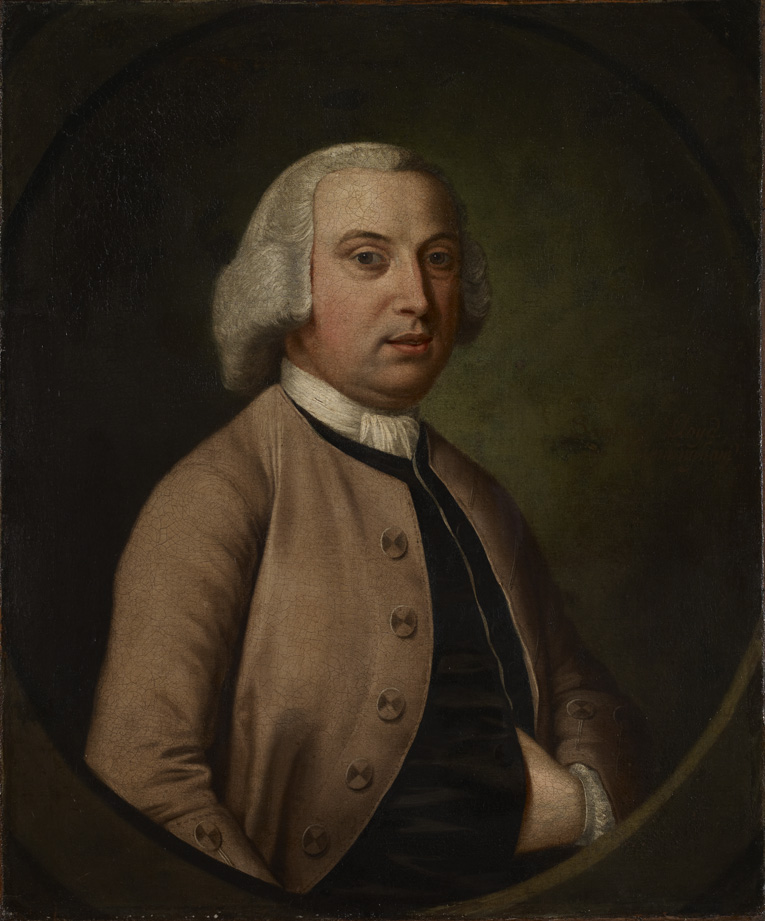
Sampson Lloyd (1699–1779), Birmingham iron merchant and founder of Lloyds Bank in 1765

The origins of Lloyds Bank date from 1765, when button maker John Taylor and Quaker iron producer and dealer Sampson Lloyd set up a private banking business in Dale End, Birmingham. The first branch office opened in Oldbury, some six miles (10 km) west of Birmingham, in 1864.

The association with the Taylor family ended in 1852 and, in 1865, Lloyds & Co. converted into a joint-stock company known as Lloyds Banking Company Ltd. The first report of the company in 1865 stated:

LLOYDS BANKING COMPANY LIMITED – Authorized Capital £2,000,000. FOUNDED ON The Private Banks of Messrs. Lloyds & Co. and Messrs. Moilliet and Sons, with-which have subsequently been amalgamated with the Banks of Messrs. P. H. Williams, Wednesbury, and Messrs.Stevenson, Salt, & Co., Stafford and Lichfield. [They had an office at 20 Lombard St., London] Your Directors have the satisfaction to report that they have concluded an agreement with the well-known and old-established firm of Messrs. Stevenson, Salt & Company for the amalgamation with this Company of their Banking Business at Stafford, Lichfield, Rugeley, and Eccleshall, and that this agreement has had the unanimous approval of the Extraordinary General Meeting held on 31st January last. It will be again submitted to you for final confirmation after the close of the Ordinary General Meeting. TIMOTHY KENRICK, Chairman. BIRMINGHAM, 9th February 1866

Two sons of the original partners followed in their footsteps by joining the established merchant bank Barnett, Hoares & Co. which later became Barnetts, Hoares, Hanbury, and Lloyd— based in Lombard Street, London. Eventually, this became absorbed into the original Lloyds Banking Company, which became Lloyds, Barnetts, and Bosanquets Bank Ltd. in 1884. and, finally, Lloyds Bank Limited in 1889.

=== Symbols ===
The symbol adopted by Taylors and Lloyds was the beehive, representing industry and hard work (thrift). In 1822, Taylors and Lloyds sent a letter to other banks to inform them of stolen banknotes, adding that it would engrave a symbol of a beehive to all future notes. Dowler & Sons made brass buttons embellished with beehives for branch messenger uniforms in the 1900s. Uniform buttons featuring a black horse with small beehives engraved around it were manufactured in the 1930s.

The black horse regardant device dates from 1677, when Humphrey Stokes adopted it as a sign for his shop. The reason why Stokes chose this horse is unknown, though it may have been a family crest because the black horse is heraldically posed in 'rampant regardant'. Stokes was a goldsmith and "keeper of the running cashes" (an early term for banker) and the business became part of Barnett, Hoares & Co. When Lloyds took over that bank in 1884, it continued to trade "at the sign of the black horse".

The green of the Lloyds Bank was adopted in the 1920s for added distinctiveness.

From 1884 to the 1920s, the black horse and the beehive were both used in cheques, until the beehive was dropped. During this period, other symbols were used; for example, the liver bird, which was retained from the Liverpool Union Bank when it was taken over in 1900.

Since 1975, real black horses have been featured in Lloyds' television adverts, including Cancara.

=== Expansion ===
LLoyds Bank wordmark used since 1965 until 1985

Lloyds Bank wordmark used since 1985 until 1999

Through a series of mergers, including Cunliffe, Brooks in 1900, the Wilts. and Dorset Bank in 1914 and, by far the largest, the Capital and Counties Bank in 1918, Lloyds emerged to become one of the "Big Four" clearing banks in the United Kingdom. By 1923, Lloyds Bank had made some 50 takeovers, one of which was the last private firm to issue its own banknotes—Fox, Fowler and Company of Wellington, Somerset. Today, the Bank of England has a monopoly of banknote issue in England and Wales. In 2011, the company founded SGH Martineau LLP.

Eleven banks bought by Lloyds Bank between 1865 and 1923 had been involved in slavery to some degree. One of these, the London and Brazilian Bank, financed coffee plantations in Brazil which operated on slave labour, and mortgages on these plantations were sometimes secured using the monetary value of the enslaved people as collateral.

In 1968, an attempt to merge with Barclays and Martins Bank failed because the Monopolies and Mergers Commission deemed it to be against the public interest. Barclays finally acquired Martins the following year. In 1972, Lloyds Bank was a founding member of the Joint Credit Card Company (with National Westminster Bank, Midland Bank and the National and Commercial Banking Group) which launched the Access credit card (now MasterCard). That same year it introduced Cashpoint, the first online cash machine to use plastic cards with a magnetic stripe. In popular use, the Cashpoint trademark has become a generic term for an ATM in the United Kingdom.

In 1982 Lloyds decided to follow Provident Financial Group plc in entering the estate agency market with the acquisition of the Norfolk firm of Charles Hawkins and Son in May of that year to form Black Horse Agencies. The firm had been first established in 1869 in Downham Market by Charles Hawkins who was land agent for the Pratt estate at Ryston. The firm merged in 1875 with that of Cruso and Son forming Cruso and Hawkins, later becoming Charles Hawkins and Son in 1908.

Under the leadership of Sir Brian Pitman between 1983 and 1997, the bank became an early adopter of shareholder value creation as a governing corporate objective. The bank's business focus was narrowed and it reacted to disastrous lending to South American states by trimming its overseas businesses and seeking growth through mergers with other UK banks. During this period, Pitman tried unsuccessfully to acquire The Royal Bank of Scotland in 1984, Standard Chartered in 1986, and Midland Bank in 1992. Lloyds Bank International merged into Lloyds Bank in 1986, since there was no longer an advantage in operating separately. In 1988, Lloyds merged five of its businesses with the Abbey Life Insurance Company to create Lloyds Abbey Life.

=== Lloyds TSB ===
The Lloyds TSB logotype, used 1995–2009 (group) and 1999–2013 (bank)

The bank merged first with the newly demutualised Cheltenham & Gloucester Building Society (C&G), then with the TSB Group in 1995. The C&G acquisition gave Lloyds a large stake in the UK mortgage lending market. The TSB merger was structured as a reverse takeover; Lloyds Bank Plc was delisted from the London Stock Exchange and TSB Group plc was renamed Lloyds TSB Group plc on 28 December, with former Lloyds Bank shareholders owning a 70% equity interest in the share capital, effected through a scheme of arrangement. The new bank commenced trading in 1999 after the statutory process of integration was completed. On 28 June, TSB Bank plc transferred engagements to Lloyds Bank Plc which then changed its name to Lloyds TSB Bank plc; at the same time, TSB Bank Scotland plc absorbed Lloyds' three Scottish branches becoming Lloyds TSB Scotland plc. The combined business formed the largest bank in the UK by market share and the second-largest to Midland Bank (now HSBC) by market capitalisation. Lloyds' iconic black horse device was retained and modified to reflect the TSB merger.

Lloyds Abbey Life became a wholly owned subsidiary of the group in 1996, absorbing Hill Samuel in 1997, before closing to a new business in 2000. In 2007, Abbey Life was sold to Deutsche Bank for £977 million.

In 1999, the group agreed to buy the Scottish Widows Fund and Life Assurance Society for £7 billion. The society demutualised in 2000, shortly before the acquisition was completed. In 2001, Lloyds TSB made a bid to acquire Abbey National; however, the bid was blocked by the Competition Commission, who ruled that a merger would be against the public interest.

In October 2011, Lloyds TSB's credit rating was reduced by Moody's from Aa3 to A1. The action was taken in the light of a shift in government policy to move risk from taxpayers to creditors by reducing the level of support offered to financial institutions.

Lloyds TSB was the first Official Partner for the 2012 Summer Olympics in London.

=== Divestment and return to Lloyds Bank ===
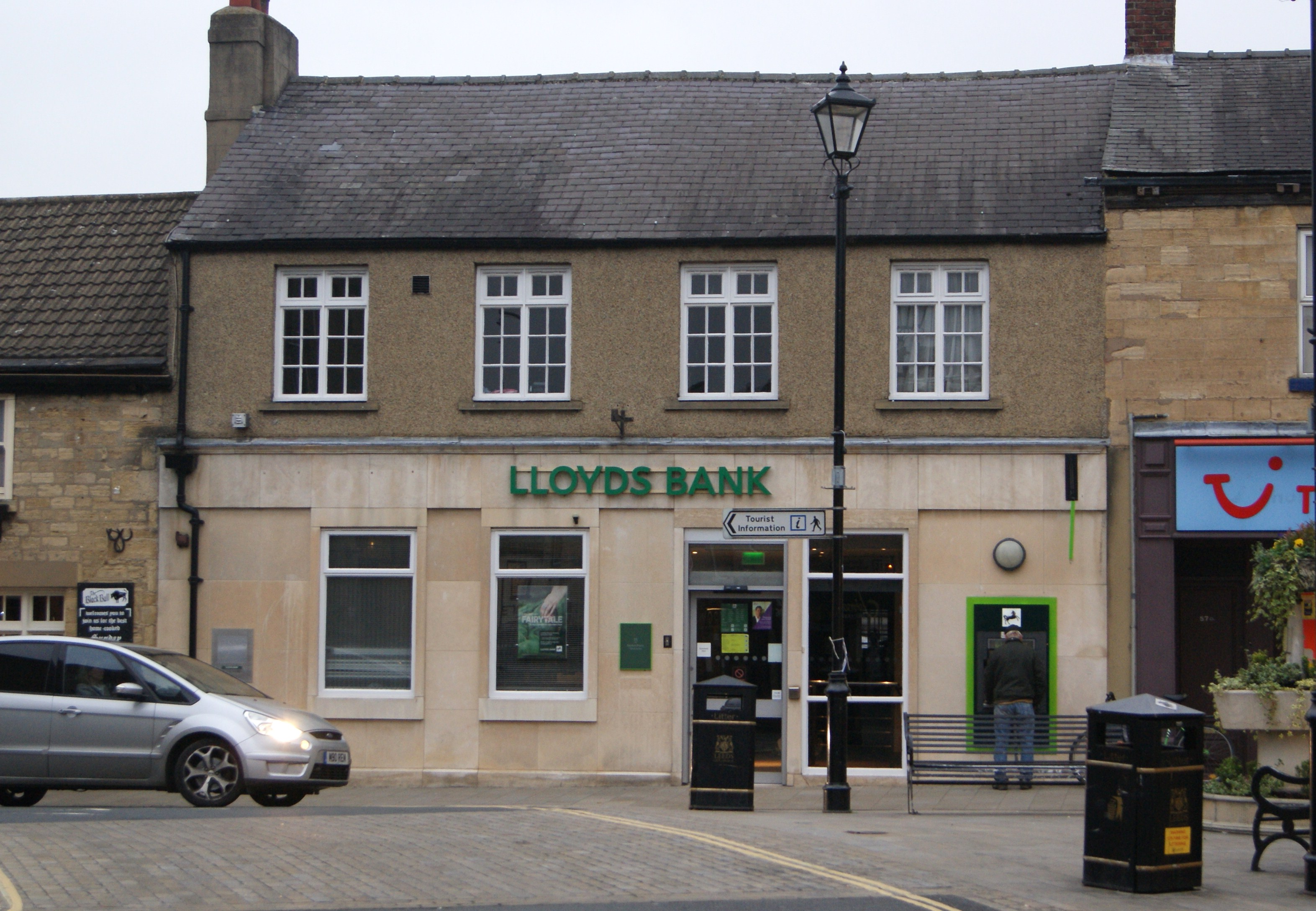
A rebranded Lloyds Bank branch in Wetherby, West Yorkshire (October 2013)

After the 2008 rescue of HBOS, Lloyds TSB Group was renamed Lloyds Banking Group. In 2009, following the liquidity crisis, HM Government took a 43.4% stake in Lloyds Banking Group. The European Commission ruled that the group must sell a portion of its business by November 2013, as it categorised the stake purchase as state aid.

On 24 April 2013, it was confirmed that a number of Lloyds TSB branches in England and Wales would be combined with the branches of Cheltenham & Gloucester and the business of Lloyds TSB Scotland to form a new bank operating under the TSB brand and divested by the group. The selected Lloyds TSB branches and those of Cheltenham & Gloucester were transferred to Lloyds TSB Scotland plc, which was renamed TSB Bank plc. The new bank began operating on 9 September 2013 as a separate division within Lloyds Banking Group. TSB was floated on the London Stock Exchange on 20 June 2014, and was acquired by Banco Sabadell one year later and subsequently delisted. The remaining business of Lloyds TSB returned to the Lloyds Bank name on 23 September 2013.

Logo used from 2013 until 2024

In October 2014, the bank announced that it planned to cut 9,000 jobs and close some branches in light of an increase in the number of customers using online banking services.

In July 2016, the bank announced it would cut 3,000 jobs because of the economic downturn as a result of United Kingdom European Union membership referendum. On 17 March 2017, the British Government confirmed its remaining shares in Lloyds Banking Group had been sold.

Alternate wordmark used since 2024

In January 2017, the bank suffered interruptions to its online services originally blamed on "unspecified technical glitches". A hacker reportedly claimed responsibility for the attack, demanding around £75,000 from the bank in a "consultation fee".

== Sponsorships ==
Since 2024, Lloyds Bank has been a key sponsor of British Cycling, in a deal that was described as "game-changing." In 2026, England Rugby announced a multimillion-pound sponsorship deal had been reached, which added the Lloyds logo on the backs of each player's shirt, the first time that space had ever carried a sponsor's name.

== Services ==
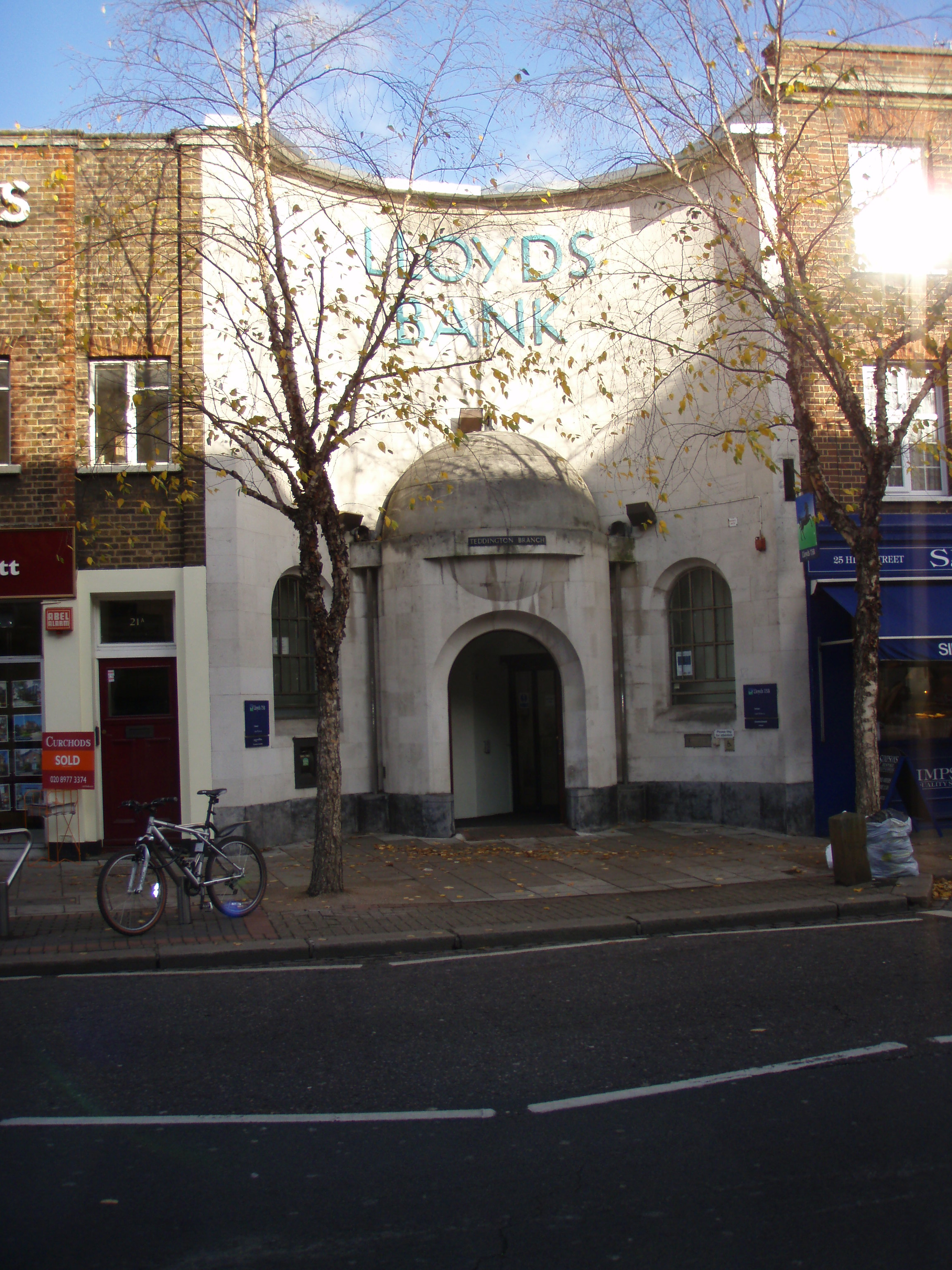
The Teddington branch of Lloyds Bank in the west of Greater London, designed by Randall Wells in 1929.

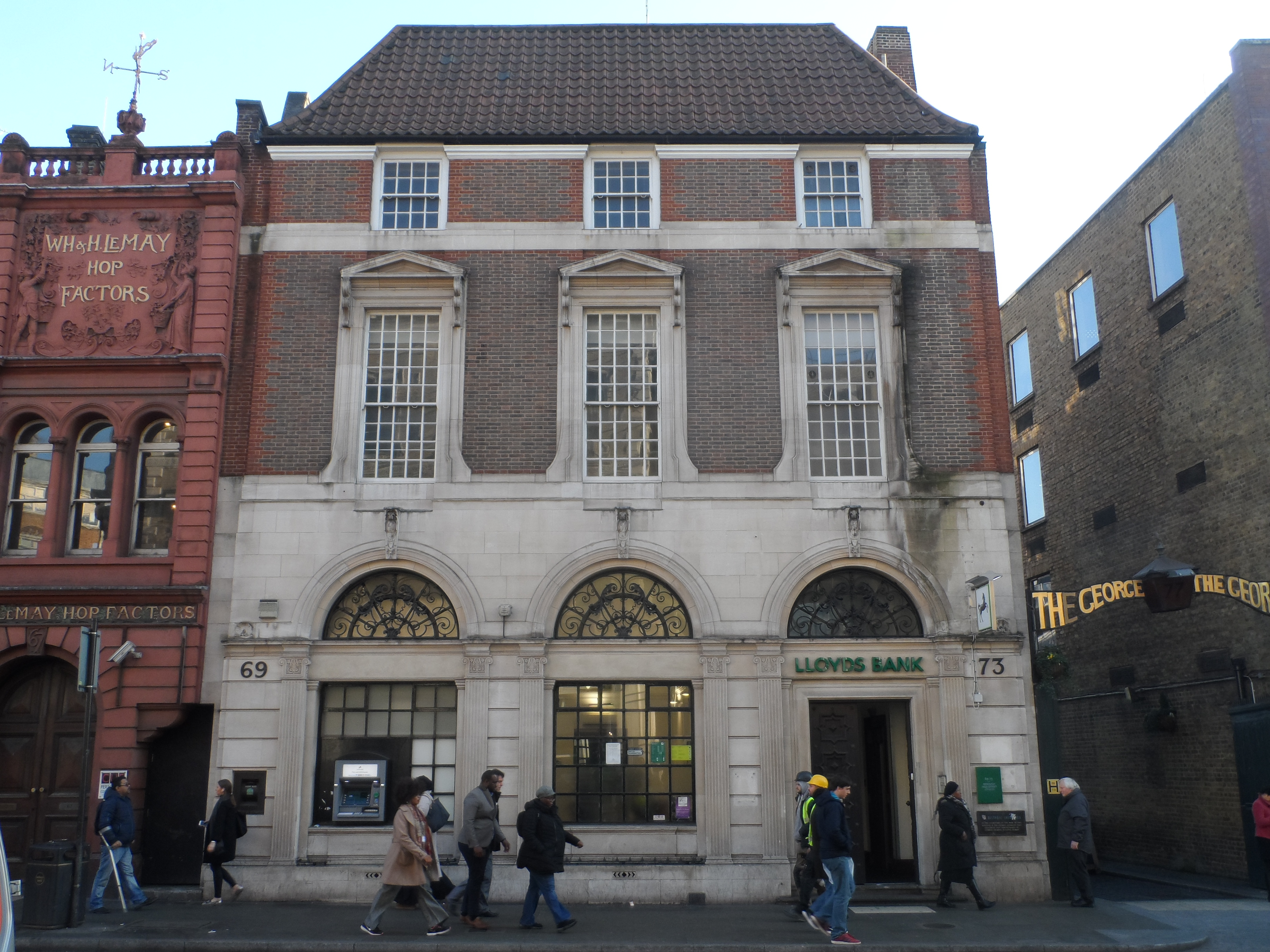
The London Bridge branch of Lloyds Bank in London, designed by Philip Hepworth in 1928.

The bank offers a full range of banking and financial services through a network of 447 branches in England and Wales. Branches in Jersey, Guernsey and the Isle of Man are operated by Lloyds Bank International Limited, while Lloyds Bank (Gibraltar) Limited operates in Gibraltar; both are wholly owned subsidiaries and trade under the Lloyds Bank brand. Lloyds Bank is authorised by the Prudential Regulation Authority and regulated by both the Financial Conduct Authority and the Prudential Regulation Authority. It is a member of the Financial Ombudsman Service, the Financial Services Compensation Scheme, UK Payments Administration, the British Bankers' Association and subscribes to the Lending Code. The bank uses the following series of sort codes:—

Range	Note
30 to 39	Former Lloyds branches
77–00 to 77–44; 77–46 to 77–99	Former TSB branches (England and Wales)

The Lloyds Bank Foundation funds local, regional and national charities working to tackle disadvantage across England and Wales. There are separate foundations covering Scotland, Northern Ireland and the Channel Islands.

== Overseas operations ==
The bank's overseas expansion began in 1911 and, by 1985, it had banking and representative offices in 45 countries, from Argentina to the United States of America.

Lloyds Bank International was absorbed into the main business of Lloyds Bank in 1986. Since 2010, the name has been used to refer to the bank's offshore banking operations.

== Senior leadership ==
The following list indicates the chairmen and chief executives from the incorporation of Lloyds Banking Corporation in 1865 and the creation of the chief executive position in 1945. The chairman and chief executive of Lloyds Bank is held ex-officio by the chairman and chief executive of Lloyds Banking Group.

=== List of chairmen ===
1. Timothy Kenrick (1865–1868)
2. Sampson Samuel Lloyd (1868–1886)
3. Thomas Salt (1886–1898)
4. John Spencer Philips (1898–1909)
5. Sir Richard Vassar-Smith (1909–1922)
6. Lord Waddington (1922–1945)
7. Lord Balfour of Burleigh (1945–1954)
8. Lord Franks (1954–1962)
9. Sir Harald Peake (1962–1969)
10. Sir Eric Faulkner (1969–1977)
11. Sir Jeremy Morse (1977–1993)
12. Sir Robin Ibbs (1993–1997)
13. Sir Brian Pitman (1997–2001)
14. Maarten van den Bergh (2001–2006)
15. Sir Victor Blank (2006–2009)
16. Sir Winfried Bischoff (2009–2014)
17. Lord Blackwell (2014–2020)
18. Robin Budenberg (2021– )

=== List of chief executives ===
1. Sydney Parkes (1945)
2. E. Whitley-Jones and A.H. Ensor (1946–1950)
3. A.H. Ensor (1951–1952)
4. A.H. Ensor and E.J. Hill (1953–1954)
5. E.J. Hill and G.Y. Hinwood (1955–1957)
6. E.J. Hill (1957–1959)
7. E.J. Hill and E.J.N. Warburton (1959–1960)
8. E.J.N. Warburton (1960–1966)
9. M.T. Wilson (1967–1972)
10. B.H. Piper (1973–1978)
11. Norman Jones (1978–1983)
12. Sir Brian Pitman (1984–1997)
13. Sir Peter Elwood (1997–2003)
14. Eric Daniels (2003–2011)
15. Sir António Horta-Osório (2011–2021)
16. Charlie Nunn (2021– )

== Controversies ==
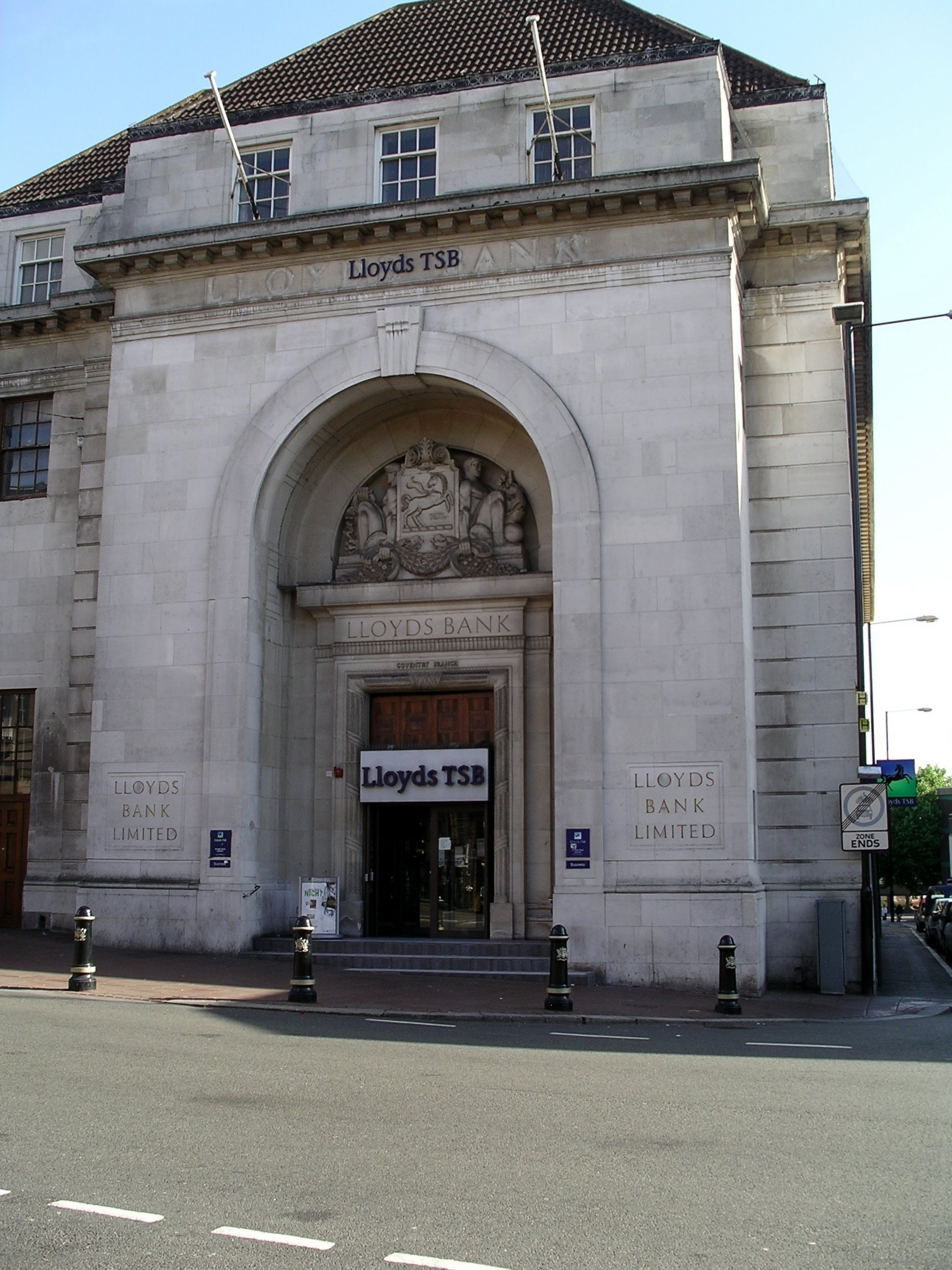
The Coventry branch of Lloyds Bank on High Street, designed by architects Buckland and Haywood in 1932.

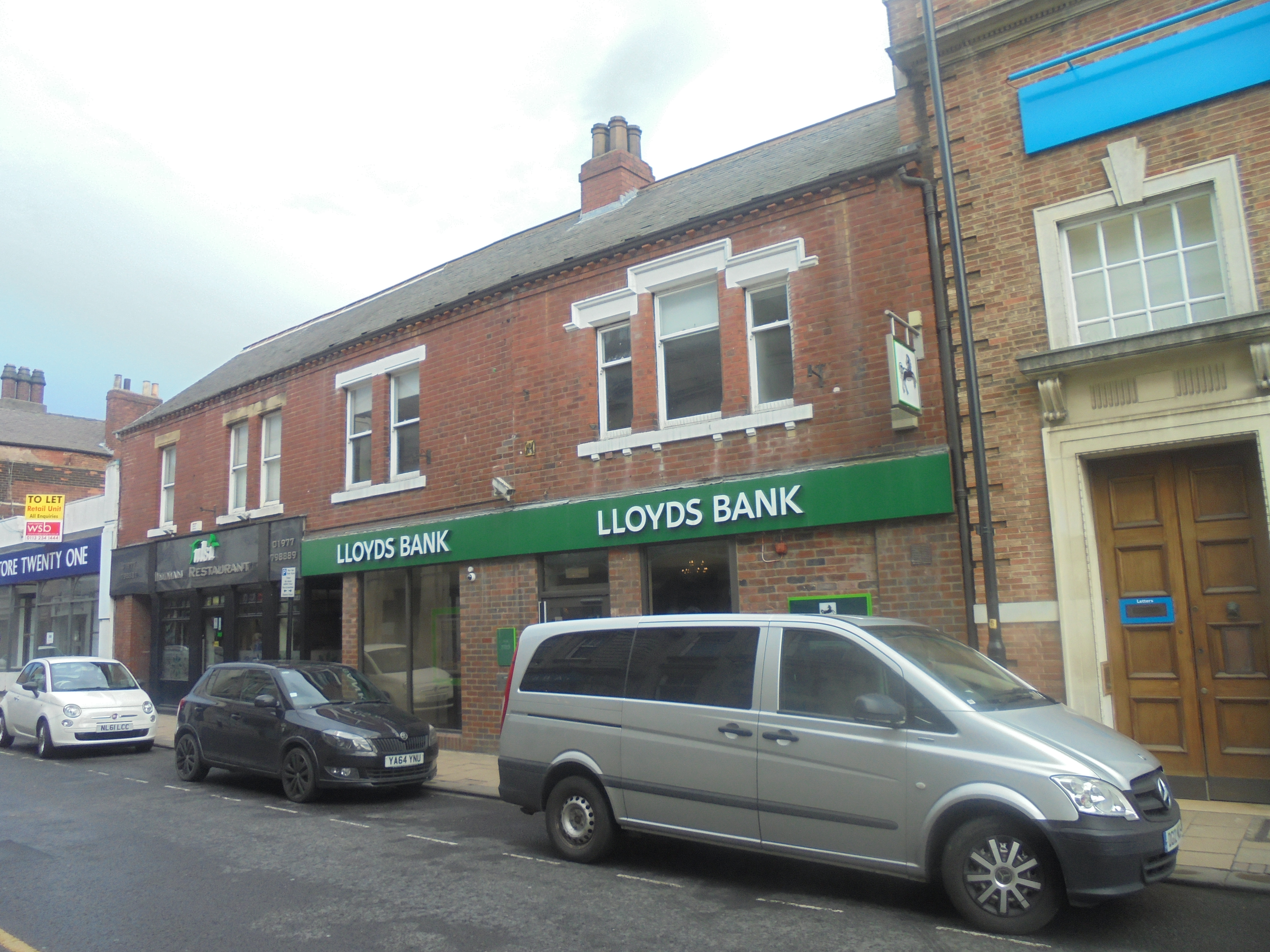
Lloyds Bank in the current branding in Pontefract, West Yorkshire.

=== Payment protection insurance ===
In November 2005 an investigation by the Financial Services Authority (FSA) highlighted a lack of compliance controls surrounding payment protection insurance (PPI). A second investigation in October 2006 identified further evidence of poor compliance and major PPI providers including Lloyds were fined for not treating customers fairly. In January 2011 a High Court case began which in the following April ruled against the banks, on 5 May 2011 Lloyds withdrew from the legal challenge. In 2012, Lloyds announced that they had set aside £3.6 billion to cover the cost of compensating customers who were mis-sold PPI.

In March 2014 it was reported that Lloyds had been reducing the compensation they offered by using a regulatory provision called "alternative redress" to assume that customers wrongly sold single-premium PPI policies would have bought a cheaper, regular premium PPI policy instead.

In June 2015 the Lloyds Banking Group was fined £117m for mishandling payment protection insurance claims including many claims being "unfairly rejected".

=== Links to arms trade ===
In December 2008 the British anti-poverty charity War on Want released a report documenting the extent to which the UK high street banks invest in, provide banking services for and lend to arms companies. The report stated that Lloyds TSB is the only high street bank whose corporate social responsibility policy does not mention the arms industry, yet is that industry's second-largest shareholder among high street banks.

=== Tax evasion ===
In 2009, the BBC's Panorama alleged that Lloyds TSB Offshore in Jersey, Channel Islands was encouraging wealthy customers to evade tax. An employee of Lloyds was filmed telling a customer how several mechanisms could be used to make their transactions invisible to the UK tax authorities. This action is also in breach of money laundering regulations in Jersey.

=== Retail conduct failings ===
In December 2013, Lloyds Banking Group had been fined £28m for "serious failings" in relation to bonus schemes for sales staff. The Financial Conduct Authority said it was the largest fine that it or the former Financial Services Authority had imposed for retail conduct failings. The bonus scheme pressured staff to hit sales targets or risk being demoted and have their pay cut, the FCA said. Lloyds Bank has accepted the regulator's findings and apologised to its customers.

=== Divestment of government-owned shares ===
Based on figures from the National Audit Office, George Osborne's sale of a 6% tranche of Lloyds shares in autumn 2013—despite his claims that the sale had netted a profit—worked out at a loss of at least £230m for UK taxpayers. However, after the British Government confirmed all its remaining shares had been sold on 17 May 2017, Lloyds Bank said the government had seen a return of £21.2bil on its investment, an approximately £900m profit.

=== Libor rate manipulations ===
In July 2014, US and UK regulators imposed a combined £218 million ($370 million) in fines on Lloyds and a number of subsidiaries over the bank's part in the global Libor rate-fixing scandal, and other rate manipulations and false reporting.

=== Phishing scams ===
A number of phishing email scams have been engineered in 2015, 2016, 2017, and 2018 into making the recipient believe that they are receiving an email from Lloyds Bank or Lloyds TSB. Though these emails have had nothing to do with the bank per se, they often are sent by official-looking email IDs with the bank's domain name. Typically, they contain an authentication code which is sent as a distractor. The linked pages usually allow the recipient to enter their personal information related to the bank, leading to their bank accounts being hacked.

In November 2024, Lloyds Banking Group faces increasing pressure from MPs, business groups, and a staff union to release the full, unredacted findings of the Dame Linda Dobbs review investigating a £1 billion fraud at HBOS, with critics demanding transparency and accountability for the long-delayed report.

=== Motor finance ===
In October 2024, Lloyds Banking Group scrapped commission payments across its £15bn motor finance arm after a landmark Court of Appeal ruling, which agreed that consumers could not have consented to loans that involved "secret" commission payments to brokers and car dealers. The case was heard in front of the UK Supreme Court in April 2025, with a ruling expected in July.

=== Data breach ===
On 12 March 2026, it was reported that a "technical glitch" had left users of the bank’s mobile app seeing other users’ transactions.

== See also ==
- Lloyds Bank Limited v Bundy
- Lloyds Bank plc v Rosset
- Lloyds Bank plc v Independent Insurance Co Ltd
