= Itchen College =

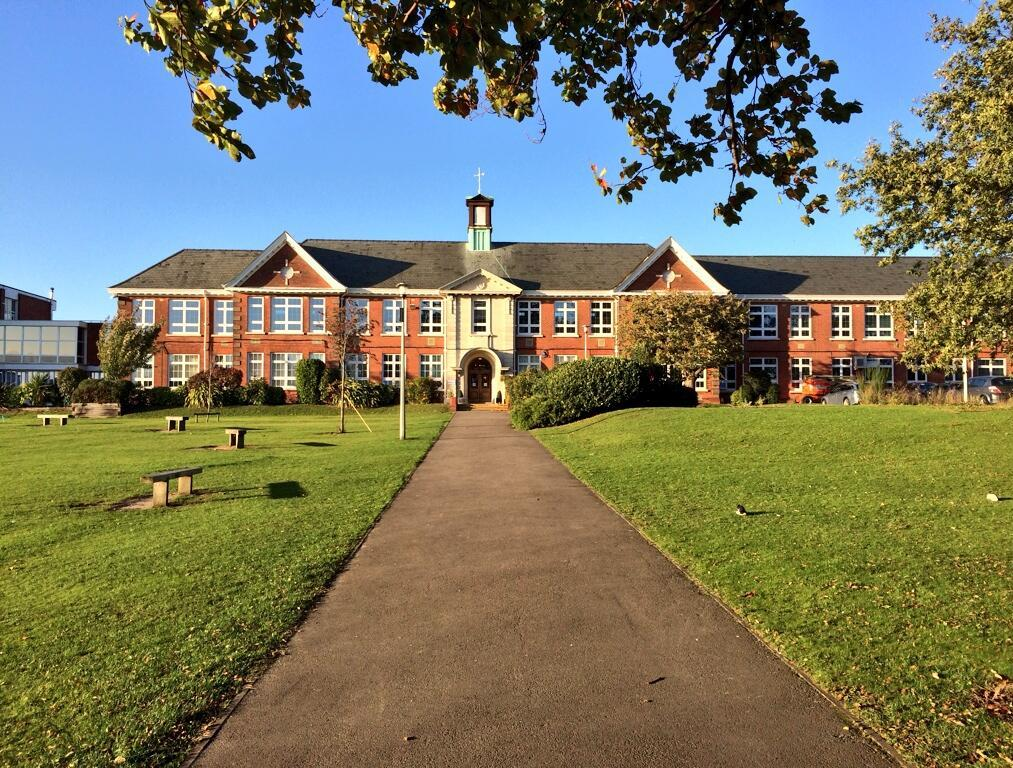
- Itchen College as seen from Middle Road.

Location
- Middle Road, Bitterne; Southampton, Hampshire, SO19 7TB; England; 50°54′31.18″N 1°21′27.77″W

Information
- Type: Sixth form college
- Established: 1906
- Local authority: Southampton City Council
- Department for Education URN: 130704 Tables
- Ofsted: Reports
- Principal: Rebecca Stratton
- Gender: Mixed
- Age range: 16+
- Website: www.itchen.ac.uk

Itchen Sixth Form College (also known as Itchen College) is a mixed sixth form college in Bitterne, Southampton, Hampshire, England. It was established in 1906 and was originally a mixed secondary school, it later became Itchen Grammar School under the reforms of the Butler Education Act. It became its present state following further reform in the 1980s.

== History ==
=== Woolston site ===
==== Itchen Pupil Teachers' Centre ====
Itchen College opened on 6 October 1906 as a Pupil Teachers' Centre in Raymond Lodge, Bridge Road, Woolston. It later moved to the first floor of Porchester Road Elementary School (which later became Woolston Secondary School for Boys), Woolston, in 1916.

Pupils started at the centre at age 13 and took the Cambridge Junior Local Examination after completing a two-year course. If they passed the exam, they could go on to become pupil teachers before moving to teacher training college.

The first permanent principal of the centre was Edith North, who held the position until 1916. She was succeeded by Miss G.V. Cook, who remained headmistress until 1918, when she was promoted to a larger school in East London. A temporary headmistress, Mrs Macrae-Gibson, took over until it was decided that a headmaster should be appointed. The person appointed was Mr F.J. Hemmings, in 1919.

==== Expansion and move to Middle Road ====
In 1908, the local Board of Education called for improved secondary education facilities. A report titled "Woolston New Secondary School" was drafted by the director of education, recommending a school to accommodate 170 children.

Plans for a new building on a larger site were then drawn up, but financial difficulties meant that the land at Middle Road (the college's current site) was not bought until 1912. The land was rough and covered with gorse, bracken, and blackberry bushes, and the First World War broke out before work could start to clear it.

The plans for a new school were shelved during the war and not reconsidered until 1919. Work erecting temporary structures to house the new influx of post-war students was slow, however, and the centre was not able to move until 1921. By this time, the centre had 228 students on roll and was full to capacity, having to turn students away due to lack of room.

=== Itchen Secondary School ===
In 1921, Itchen Pupil Teachers' Centre became Itchen Coeducational Secondary School, moving into temporary huts on the current Middle Road site. The foundation stone for the present building in Middle Road was laid in December 1925, but buildings were not completed until 1938.

The temporary buildings consisted of: a science laboratory; a workshop for woodwork and metalwork; a housecraft room; an assembly room that doubled as art and physics rooms; two staff rooms; and a Headmaster's room. The school had to keep using four rooms at the Porchester Road School, as the temporary buildings at Middle Road couldn't accommodate the large number of pupils. If pupils or staff needed to travel from one end of the school to another, it was a journey of one and a half miles.

In 1919, Mr Hemmings started an annual prize distribution and speech day. This took place every July, and is still a tradition that the current Itchen College does today with their annual Celebration Event.

Mr Hemmings was transferred to Taunton's School in 1924 and was replaced in 1925 by Mr. E. Cotemann, with the role named as 'principal'.

==== December 1930 fire ====
Building work to complete the permanent buildings had all but stopped and in 1929 the Board of Education considered the move to complete them and improve the inadequate temporary facilities. However, before the completion plans had been drawn up, fire broke out on 8 December 1930. The Assembly Hall and Art room were completely destroyed, but the temporary huts escaped relatively unscathed. A temporary hall was put up quickly by the Board, but support for new facilities at Itchen languished and was given to two other secondary schools who were deemed to have a greater need for them - King Edward VI School, and the Girls' Grammar School.

==== Improvements to facilities ====
In 1934, Itchen Secondary School was given four new permanent classrooms and the temporary huts were finally replaced with a permanent structure. Principal Cotemann was still fighting for plans to be approved, demanding a gymnasium in 1935. The Board agreed in 1936 and, in 1937, work not only started on the gymnasium, but also on an entire new West Wing. This included an assembly hall (including stage), gymnasium, dining room and kitchen. An additional art room, craft room, Prefect's room, library, and senior mistresses' room were added shortly after.

Work on the school was finally completed in 1938, thirteen years after it began.

==== World War II ====
When World War II broke out in 1939, the government's plans to evacuate children from danger areas to safer parts of the country were put into effect. Because of Southampton's location on the south coast and its status as a large port city, it was an important target for the Luftwaffe (see Southampton Blitz). Because of this risk, the city's children were among those covered by the government's plans.

On 1 September 1939, half of Itchen Secondary School's 520 pupils evacuated, the school combining with Andover Grammar School. Upon arrival, staff and senior boys dug air raid shelters before settling into life outside of Southampton.

Andover Grammar School had their lessons in the mornings while Itchen carried out theirs in the afternoon and evenings, generally between 13:30 and 17:30, and allowed alternate Saturday mornings off. This schedule posed difficulties for the students, as classrooms were full of stale air and they had to conduct lessons using gas lamps with blackout curtains up at the windows.

Finding accommodation was also difficult. Andover was also housing refugees from London so the town rapidly filled up. School staff had to undertake fire-watching duties.

Itchen's new buildings were put to use during the war, being turned into an A.R.P. Post and Casualty Station with medical services. In 1940, French troops who had escaped Dunkirk, were given tea and sandwiches by the WRVS through the window of the Domestic Science room. A British restaurant was later established in the school's dining hall.

Itchen Secondary School's evacuation ended in December 1944 with the pupils returning to the Southampton site after spending 16 terms studying at Andover.

==== Post World War II ====
Upon returning to the Southampton site, many staff members had left or retired during the war and some of the school buildings were still occupied. The A.R.P. Post and Casualty Station with medical services remained in the gymnasium until 1948, and the British Restaurant remained until sometime after that.

The exterior of the school had suffered damage. The metal railings surrounding the grounds had been removed for scrap-iron during the war effort and the field and cricket pitch had been damaged. All attempts to repair the field and cricket pitch kept failing, as without fencing, people repeatedly trampled and ruined the new turf that had been laid. Eventually the field and cricket pitch were repaired to their pre-war condition.

There was an influx of students post-war, with pupil numbers doubling, mostly due to the Butler Education Act in 1944, which abolished grammar school fees in order to provide secondary school education for all.

=== Itchen Grammar School ===
Itchen Secondary School became a Grammar School in 1946 in order to accommodate the rising pupil numbers.

There were attempts to make the always coeducational school single-sex (girls only) during the 1950s but both the school and the Old Issonians Association were opposed to the idea. In 1956, Charles Thompson (Headmaster of Itchen Grammar School 1950–1971) wrote: “The school’s greatest source of strength is to be found in the fact that it is coeducational. From the earliest days of the secondary school, when coeducation was far less common than it is now, social activities involving both boys and girls were a readily accepted feature of the school.”

Itchen Grammar School thrived under Charles Thompson's twenty-one years of leadership and some of the reforms he implemented at the school were: banning the use of the cane; abolishing single-sex staff rooms; building the school swimming pool and observatory; and replacing the ‘temporary’ huts. The swimming pool was built using money raised during the 1956 Jubilee Celebrations and was the first school swimming pool in Southampton. With the huts demolished, long-awaited science laboratories were built in 1964, improving teaching as well as student satisfaction. These reforms and extensions brought Itchen Grammar School up to then-current standards.

The largest extension – designed by architects Messr Richard Sheppard, Robson and Partners of London - saw all classrooms moved to the first and second floors, with the open-plan student areas on the ground floor, opening up to the playing fields. New facilities within the extension included: science laboratories; needlework and housecraft rooms; and geography classrooms with a terrace that linked them to the observatory on the roof.

== Itchen Sixth Form College ==
In 1966 there was debate in the Southampton Education Committee about turning to a comprehensive education system. The Committee favoured the introduction of Sixth Form Colleges and three were selected as initial options for Southampton: Richard Taunton's Grammar School; the Girl's Grammar School; and Itchen Grammar School, the latter being the only coeducational Sixth Form College in Southampton.

Philip Vennis was appointed as Principal of the new Itchen Sixth Form College in 1971 and remained until his retirement in 1988. He was a strong advocate for open access, stating:

“the position is that pupils can transfer from neighbourhood comprehensives without any formal requirements, the only condition being that the student himself wishes to pursue full time education beyond sixteen and is prepared to apply himself; what matters is the degree of motivation on the part of the students; this is of the greatest importance for future success, and more so than any measure of intelligence or academic attainment, whether eleven plus or sixteen plus.”

This ideology forms part of the present-day mission at Itchen Sixth Form College, providing inclusive further education for all.

Students are mainly from areas of Southampton, east of the River Itchen and along the M27 corridor towards Fareham. The college runs an extensive bus service, and is close enough to Sholing Railway Station to allowi access from all over Hampshire.

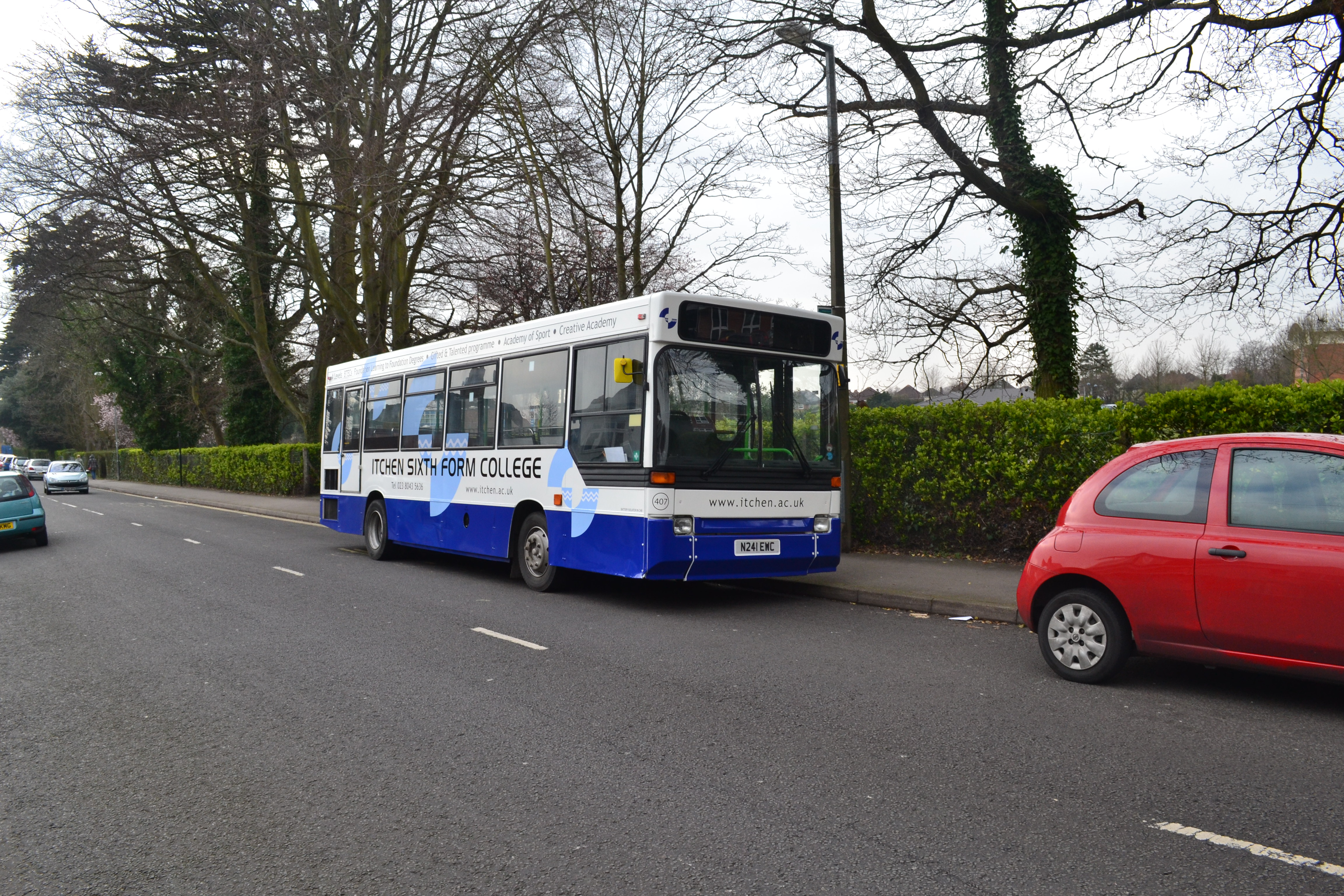
One of the college buses.

International students make up 10% of the total student body.

Full-time students study a wide range of courses including vocational, GCSEs, BTECs, and A Levels. A large number of subjects are supported by the college's Academy of Sport, High Performance Academy (for gifted and talented students), and the recently launched Creative Arts Academy, which offers specialised training and extra opportunities for students to further their skills through extra-curricular classes and trips. The college also offers a range of Adult Education courses.

The college was inspected in 2017 and in 2018 and on both occasions judged as Requiring Improvement.

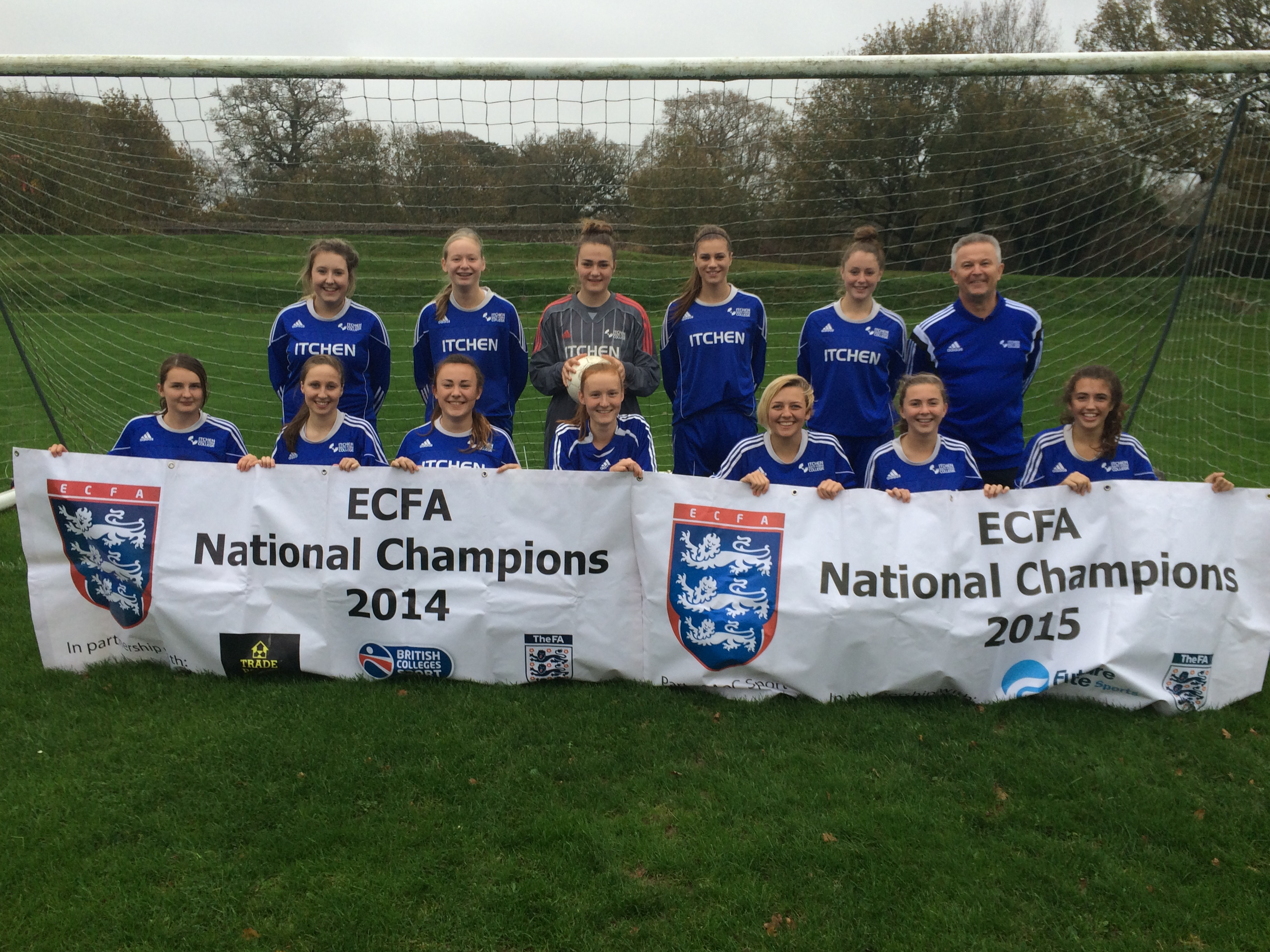
The ladies' football team are ECFA National Champions 2 years running.

=== Academy of Sport ===
The college's Academy of Sport offers expert coaching in:

- Golf
- Rugby
- Netball
- Basketball
- Hockey
- Badminton
- Football (including a football development programme run by the Chelsea Football Club Foundation).

=== Creative Arts Academy ===
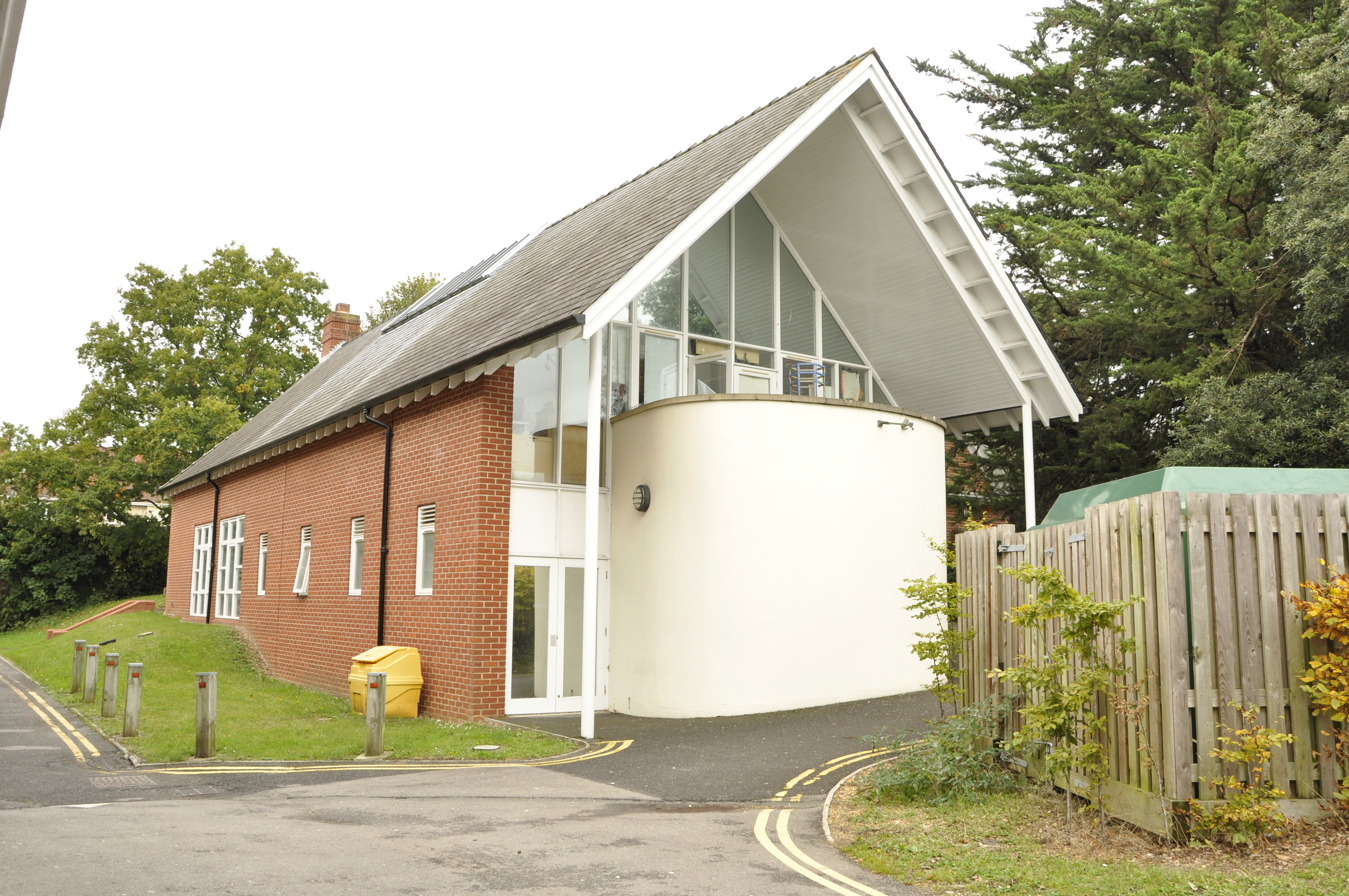
The Performing Arts building

Newly launched in 2015, the Creative Arts Academy provides students on creative courses with extra support and opportunities to enhance their skills. Students who are part of this academy have access to work placements in the Creative Industries, trips to both national and international destinations (for example, New York City), and help putting together a creative portfolio ready for when they enter the workplace.

Courses included within the Creative Arts Academy are:

- Art and Design subjects
- Film Studies
- Journalism
- Media Studies
- Performing Arts subjects

=== High Performance Academy ===
The High Performance Academy is for students who have been identified as gifted and talented by their previous school. It provides tailored support for students wanting to achieve the highest grades in their A Levels.

To be eligible, students need to have an average GCSE score of 6.5. They can also be referred to the academy by their teachers when they reach Itchen College.

The five elements to the High Performance Academy are:

- A taught programme
- Learning mentors
- Higher Education+ programme
- Extra-curricular activities
- Extended project qualification (EPQ)

=== International Students ===
International students are offered English as a Foreign Language courses; they stay with police-checked local families, and are referred to as Homestays.

=== Adult Education ===
Despite being primarily for 16-19-year-old school leavers, Itchen Sixth Form College offers adult education classes for students over 19. These include: Access to Higher Education; teacher training courses; English, Maths, and Science courses; Accountancy qualifications; and Childcare, Health and Social Care courses.

== Extra-curricular activities ==
=== Itchen Radio ===
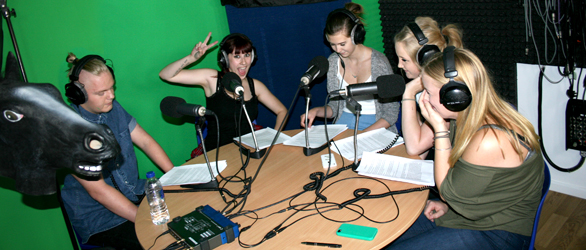
Media students taking part in a show on Itchen Radio. The black horse is also featured.

Itchen Sixth Form College runs an award-winning in-house radio station called Itchen Radio. It broadcasts once a week through local Southampton radio station Unity 101.

The radio station is run by a team of 15 students, with the group changing every academic year, on media and journalism courses and has been broadcasting for ten years. Its unofficial mascot is a black horse.

On air at least three times a week (Monday, Wednesday, and Friday), regular shows include: Half Time Oranges (sports news); international music; interviews with members of staff, politicians, and local celebrities (e.g. Matt Le Tissier); and discussions about current affairs.

=== Old Issonians Association ===
In 1920, Itchen Pupil Teachers' Centre headmaster Mr Hemmings started up the 'Old Students Association'. It was formed for alumni to keep in touch with the centre and was supposed to allow them to continue to participate with the centre.

After the Second World War, an Old Students' Association was set up. Renamed the 'Old Issonians Association' by Principal Cotemann after the evacuation ended, the name was taken from the school's initials ('I.S.S. - Itchen Secondary School).

The Association held sporting (in particular football and hockey), dramatic, and social activities for past pupils. In 1939 the association had over a hundred members and this reached over 300 post-1945. In 1956, during the Jubilee celebrations, membership reached 600.

When the college became a sixth form, membership began to fall. By 1980 it was 100. As of 2005, the Old Issonians Association website lists 5 members and states that the Association "is likely to be winding up due to lack of interest."

== Principals ==
Institution	Years	Principal
Itchen Pupil Teacher's Centre	1906–1916	Edith North
Itchen Pupil Teacher's Centre	1916–1918	Miss G. V. Cook
Itchen Pupil Teacher's Centre	1918–1919	Mrs Mcrae-Gibson (acting)
Itchen Pupil Teacher's Centre	1919–1921	Mr F. J. Hemmings
Itchen Secondary School	1921–1925	Mr F. J. Hemmings
Itchen Secondary School	1925–1946	Mr E. Cotemann
Itchen Grammar School	1946–1950	Mr E. Cotemann
Itchen Grammar School	1950–1971	Charles Thompson
Itchen Sixth Form College	1971–1988	Philip Vennis
Itchen Sixth Form College	1988–2002	Peter Church
Itchen Sixth Form College	2002–2016	Barry Hicks
Itchen Sixth Form College	2016–2017	Vanessa Cass (acting)
Itchen Sixth Form College	2017–2025	Alex Scott
Itchen Sixth Form College	2026–Present	Rebecca Stratton

== Notable former students ==
=== Itchen Secondary School ===
- Melita Norwood, Communist spy

=== Itchen Grammar School ===
- Roy Dommett, United Kingdom Chief Missile Scientist
- Graham Ovenden, artist
- William Whitlock, politician

=== Itchen Sixth Form College ===
- Charlie Nunn, chief executive (CEO) of Lloyds Banking Group since August 2021.
- Jeremy Sochan - basketball player for the San Antonio Spurs, NBA champion with the New York Knicks (2026)
- Aaron Martin, footballer for Exeter City
- Jodie Brett, footballer for Brighton & Hove Albion
- Millie Farrow, footballer for Reading
- Laura Rafferty, footballer for Southampton FC
- Kelly Simm, British artistic gymnast
- Lucy Quinn, footballer for Birmingham City
- Roger Whiteside, Chief Executive of Greggs (2013–2022)
- Atlanta Primus, Jamaican international footballer
