= Victor Blank =

English businessman (born 1942)

Sir Maurice Victor Blank (born 9 November 1942) is an English businessman and philanthropist. He is the former chairman of Lloyds TSB and the current chairman of several educational and charitable organisations including the Social Mobility Foundation, UJS Hillel and Wellbeing of Women.

== Background ==
=== Early life and education ===
Born on 9 November 1942, he was educated at Stockport Grammar School and then obtained an MA in Modern History at St Catherine's College, Oxford.

=== Career ===
In 1969, aged 26, Blank was made the youngest Partner in the history of legal firm Clifford-Turner (now Clifford Chance). At Clifford-Turner he specialised in corporate law, and co-wrote a textbook on mergers titled Weinberg & Blank on Take-overs and Mergers. He left Clifford Turner in 1981 to become Head of Corporate Finance at Charterhouse Bank (now part of HSBC), where he masterminded the buyout of Woolworth's. From 1985 to 1996 he held the posts of chairman and Chief Executive of Charterhouse. He was also a director of the Royal Bank of Scotland from 1985 to 1993.

In 1999, Blank was appointed Chairman of Mirror Group Newspapers which, during his tenure, became the UK's largest newspaper publishing group as part of the Trinity Mirror conglomerate.

From 1993 to 2006, he was Vice Chairman and then Chairman of Great Universal Stores plc, a conglomerate in the FTSE 100, which was separated into four different companies (Experian, Argos & Homebase, Burberry and Lewis Stores), the shares of which were distributed to shareholders. He was made Chairman of GUS in 2000.

He was knighted in 1999 for services to the financial industry. In May 2006, Blank became Chairman of Lloyds TSB which, in 2008, took over Halifax Bank of Scotland (HBOS) to become the U.K.'s largest retail bank. He was a member of the Financial Reporting Council from 2002 to 2007, and a member of the Council of Oxford University from 2000 to 2007. He was appointed a senior adviser to US private equity group TPG Capital in November 2007. From 2000 to 2006 Blank was also Chairman of the Industrial Development Advisory Board.

In 2010, Blank was appointed as a UK Business Ambassador by the government to promote British commercial interests around the world. After the election in 2010 Blank was invited to continue as a Business Ambassador by Prime Minister David Cameron.

Blank and former Lloyds TSB chief executive Eric Daniels, have both been recipients of letters from Lloyd's shareholders who are members of the Lloyds Action Now Association. The letters represent a campaign on behalf of 7,000 private shareholders claiming compensation for their losses arising from the HBOS takeover. They stipulate that, information concerning a £25.4 billion Emergency Liquidity Assistance loan from the Bank of England to HBOS, which was made to keep it afloat before the takeover, was not declared in takeover offer documents on which they were asked to vote. They stipulate that, had this loan been declared, then the true financial state of the bank would have been made apparent.

== Lloyds TSB and Lloyds Banking Group ==
Blank became Chairman of Lloyds TSB in May 2006.

=== Credit crisis ===
When the credit crisis overwhelmed Northern Rock, the entire British banking industry came under intense scrutiny. Lloyds TSB stood out thanks to its conservative policies which had largely kept it out of the so-called "toxic securities" dealt in by other banks with riskier business models. Prime Minister Gordon Brown supported Lloyds in its acquisition of HBOS, a huge but struggling bank, in order to help stabilise the UK banking system.

Blank, on behalf of the Lloyds TSB board, talked to Prime Minister Gordon Brown about permitting the merger to go ahead. Initially, it was thought that the merger would not be permitted due to existing competition law which prohibits mergers of this size and nature to go ahead. However, due to the nature of the credit crisis and the need for immediate action to save HBOS, Gordon Brown said that he would waive the competition law and ensure the merger went through. On 15 September, an agreement was reached in principle, and the FSA began moves the following day.

On 19 January 2009, the merger between Lloyds TSB and HBOS formally took place with the adoption of a new name for the combined group – "Lloyds Banking Group" – with Blank as its chairman. Because of the state of the financial markets at the time, if the merger had not gone ahead, there would have been an almost total meltdown of confidence in the British banking system as a whole.

On 12 February 2009, the CEO of Lloyds group, Eric Daniels, was questioned about the banking crisis during a session of the Treasury Select Committee of the House of Commons. One of the key issues concerned Lloyds' takeover of HBOS in 2008, and the amount of due diligence carried out before the acquisition. Mr Daniels stated that a company would always like to do more due diligence on when assessing another company, but there are limits on how much is possible prior to an actual acquisition. Losses were a little higher than the £10 billion expected because of crash in the housing marked which wrote-off substantial property loans.

Blank confirmed in an August 2009 interview with the BBC's Business editor, Robert Peston that losses had been "at the worst end of expectations". He made it clear that what had surprised the Lloyds board was not the amount of financial losses, but the speed at which they had happened. Blank claimed that this was due to the unexpectedly sharp contraction of the world economy in the last quarter of 2008.

Investors were angered at the decline in the share price and the substantial losses they were suffering coupled with Blank's dismissal of the notion of a dividend payment. Blank had told Jeff Randall the payment of a dividend to shareholders would not have been – as he put it – "seemly" – and in any case a dividend blocker had been applied by the Government for 2009.

On 17 May 2009, Blank announced that he would be retiring before the next Annual General Meeting and that Lloyds should immediately begin the process to find a successor. He agreed with the board to serve 6 months notice, whilst they started the process of finding a successor. Once a successor was found, Blank agreed to stay for 4 months. Although he was entitled to 6 months salary, Blank suggested that the last two months' wages be donated to charity.

== Apology from Oxford ==
In 2006, Blank received an apology from Roger Ainsworth, Master of St Catherine's College, Oxford (at which Blank had studied and of which he was an Honorary Fellow), in response to a letter sent on his behalf by the media lawyers Carter-Ruck. The law firm requested a withdrawal by Ainsworth of an allegation as well as an apology. No damages or costs were claimed. The allegation against Blank was over the proportion of Oxford University's funding that should be passed on to colleges.

In the immediate aftermath of the Carter-Ruck letter, Ainsworth made a statement to the Heads of Colleges and Bursars who attended the meeting of the Conference of Colleges in which he withdrew his remarks and apologised. Some members of the university saw the use of letters from libel specialists as an inappropriate way of resolving differences between colleagues.

In the summer of 2007, Blank was at the centre of a disagreement between some members of the Council of the University of Oxford and members of the Congregation of the university, over the council's proposal to re-nominate Blank for election to serve for an exceptional third term as an external member. He subsequently announced that he would not be seeking re-election, a move arguably connected to a call by several hundred members of the university's Congregation for the re-election proposal to be debated and, if a majority so decided, rejected. Blank's supporters, however, argued that the guidelines allowed exceptions to be made. Lord Butler, master of University College and former head of the Civil Service, said Blank 'had done a great job' for Oxford in his seven years on the council. Lord Patten, Oxford's Chancellor, said Blank "had been an outstanding external member of the Council and we hope we can call on his support and expertise in the years to come."

== Other interests ==
Blank was the first external member of the Oxford University Governing Council. He donated to £150,000 to the Labour Party, then led by Ed Miliband, before the 2015 United Kingdom general election. According to Peter Oborne and James Jones, Blank supported Labour Friends of Israel. Blank is a vice president of the Jewish Leadership Council. In 2023, The Guardian reported that Blank had donated £175,000 to Labour since 2020, much of which was used to fund staff for the shadow chancellor, Rachel Reeves.

Blank was the guest editor of the Today programme in 2011. Over the Christmas period it is traditional that guest editors are invited to edit the show and set the agenda for the programme. The principal item was a long interview with ex South African President F. W. de Klerk. Blank also chose leadership and philanthropy, the Eurozone crisis and the Arab/Israeli conflict as topics for discussion.

== Philanthropy ==
Blank is involved with the following not-for-profit organisations:

Blank is the patron of numerous charities, social enterprises and not for profit organisations. He is chairman of the Wellbeing of Women charity which funds research into female health. He has a personal connection to the charity after he lost his mother to ovarian cancer when he was 12 years old. One of his most high-profile donations comes from the money raised at his annual cricket match. Every year Blank hosts a cricket match inside his manor house and invites a large number of luminaries and famous cricketers and charges people to play. The match has raised more than £5.5 million for charity over a 24-year running period. It is estimated that one day's cricket raises £250,000 for charity.

Blank has called out to the city and especially the bankers to do more to promote their engagement in local philanthropies to try to improve their image. He is also the chairman of various establishments including: The Social Mobility Foundation, UJS Hillel, the Royal College of Obstetricians and Gynaecologists' health research charity, the Council of University College School and the European Advisory Board of the Cheung Kong Graduate School of Business.

- Chairman of the Social Mobility Foundation
- Chairman of UJS Hillel.
- Chairman of the Royal College of Obstetricians and Gynaecologists' health research charity, as well as an Honorary Fellow and a Patron of the Royal College
- Chairman of the Council of University College School
- Honorary Fellow of St Catherine's College, Oxford
- Trustee of the Said Business School Foundation
- Vice President of Oxford Philharmonic Orchestra
- Chairman of the European Advisory board of the Cheung Kong Graduate School of Business
- Member of the advisory board of the British Olympic Association
- Vice President of the Jewish Leadership Council.
- Member of the Financial Reporting Council and CBI Boardroom Issues Group.

== Speculation over honours ==
In early 2012, a group of Conservative party MPs suggested that Blank's role in the merger of Lloyds TSB and HBOS meant that he should be stripped of his knighthood. However, sources within the banking industry have opposed this claim by highlighting that the original stipulations behind this honour came in 1999, long before the banking crash and that a 'witch hunt' should be avoided.

Blank matriculated from the College of Arms on 14 August 2019.

Coat of arms of Victor Blank
Crest Upon a Helm with a Wreath Argent and Sable Issuant from a Coronet Or a Dragon sejant erect affronty wings displayed Argent holding in the dexter forefoot a Rapier erect proper and in the sinister a Scroll of the Torah Argent garnished Or. Escutcheon Sable on a Pale Argent between two Torches Or enflamed proper three Roundels alternately with three Roses Gules barbed and seeded proper. Badge A Star of David Or enfiling at the intersections six Mascles Argent.

== Personal life ==
Blank is Jewish, married and has three children.

== See also ==
- 2008 United Kingdom bank rescue package
- 2009 United Kingdom bank rescue package
- UK Financial Investments Limited
- Lloyds TSB
