= Eric Daniels =

American banker (born 1951)

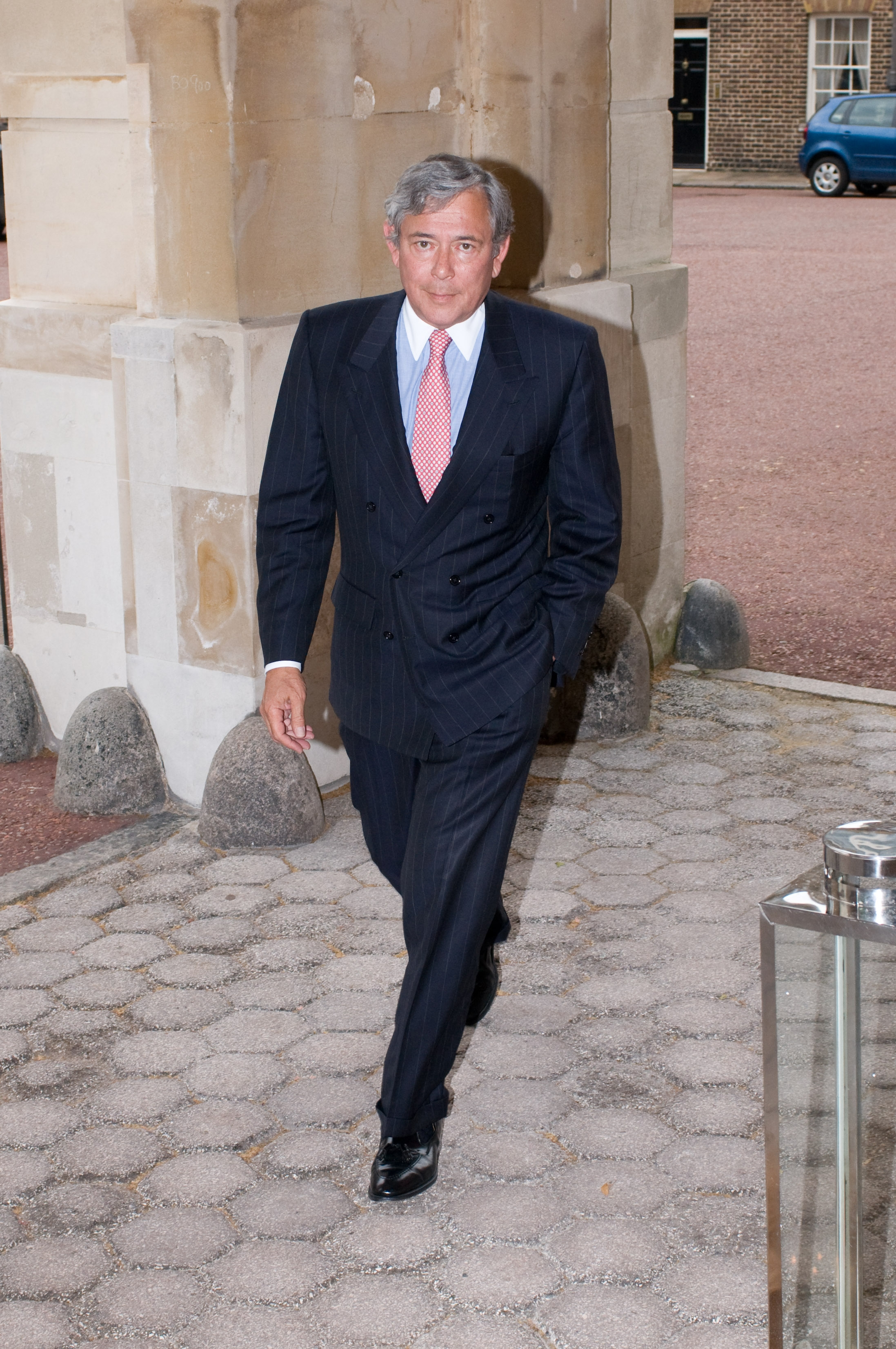
- Born: August 14, 1951 (age 75); Dillon, Montana U.S.
- Education: Cornell University; MIT Sloan School of Management
- Occupation: Business executive

John Eric Daniels (born August 14, 1951) is an American banker, and the former chief executive officer (CEO) of Lloyds Banking Group.

== Early life ==
He was born in Dillon, Montana, the son of a German university professor and a Chinese mother, who met at the University of California, Berkeley. He went to high school in New Jersey. He received a bachelor's degree in History at Cornell University in Ithaca, New York graduating in 1973, then a master's degree in Management at the MIT Sloan School of Management in Cambridge, Massachusetts leaving in 1975.

== Career ==
He worked with Citibank from 1975, based in Panama for five years, then worked in Argentina. In the late 1980s, he spent three years in London. He became chief operating officer of Citibank Consumer Bank in 1998. Citibank and Travelers merged in 1998 and he became chairman and CEO of Travelers Life and Annuity. From 2000 he was chairman and CEO of Zona Financiera, a small short-lived internet startup company, which failed in 2001. He joined Lloyds TSB in 2001 as head of retail banking. He became CEO of Lloyds TSB in June 2003, and of Lloyds Banking Group in January 2009 after the merger with HBOS. He built a reputation for being quietly spoken, thoughtful and not prone to superlatives - what many would describe as excellent, he would say was "pleasing". On 20 September 2010 it was announced that he would be retiring as Chief Executive of Lloyds.

== Credit crisis ==
He gave evidence on the banking crisis before the Treasury Select Committee of the House of Commons on February 12, 2009. One of the key issues concerned Lloyds takeover of HBOS in 2008, and the amount of due diligence carried out before the acquisition. He said that a company would always like to do more due diligence on another company, but there are limits on how much is possible prior to an actual acquisition. The resultant losses were significantly higher than the £10 billion expected, over 10 times that figure, owing to flawed credit policies, ineffective Governance, and irresponsible management.

Lloyds' chairman Sir Victor Blank confirmed in an August 2009 interview with the BBC's Robert Peston that losses had been "at the worst end of expectations", but what had surprised the Lloyds board was the speed at which the losses happened, due to the unexpectedly sharp contraction of the world economy in the last quarter of 2008 and the early part of 2009.

Criticisms have been voiced about his tax status. Sources said that Daniels had legitimately kept his non-dom status when he joined the board of Lloyds TSB in 2001.

He did not receive an expected bonus of £2.3 million in 2010, following the announcement of a further £6.3 billion loss by Lloyds TSB under his leadership.

In February 2012, he was forced to surrender up to £700,000 of a £1.45m bonus, after the mis-selling of PPI credit insurance to customers.

== See also ==
- 2008 United Kingdom bank rescue package
