= Scottish Widows =

Life insurance and pensions company located in Edinburgh

Scottish Widows Limited
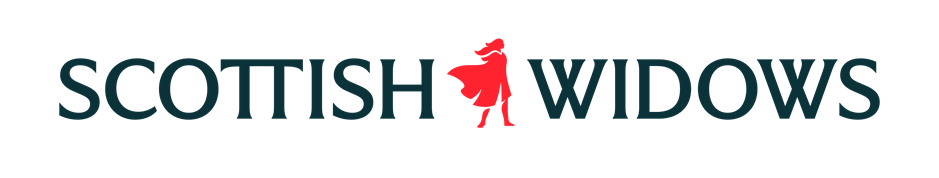
- Type: Subsidiary
- Industry: Financial services
- Founded: 1815; 211 years ago
- Headquarters: Edinburgh, Scotland, UK
- Key people: Chirantan Barua (chief executive); Danuta Gray (chair)
- Products: Life insurance Pensions; Investments; Savings
- Number of employees: 3,500 (2011)
- Parent: Lloyds Banking Group
- Website: www.scottishwidows.co.uk

Scottish Widows Limited is a life insurance, pensions and investment company based in Edinburgh, Scotland, that is a part of Lloyds Banking Group. The company has been providing financial services to the UK market since 1815 and its product range includes workplace and individual pensions, annuities, life cover, critical illness and income protection, as well as savings and investments.

Scottish Widows has over £300bn assets under administration and looks after more than 6 million customers across the UK. In addition, more than 23,000 advisers and advice firms support clients with their pensions and investments through the Scottish Widows Platform.

== History ==
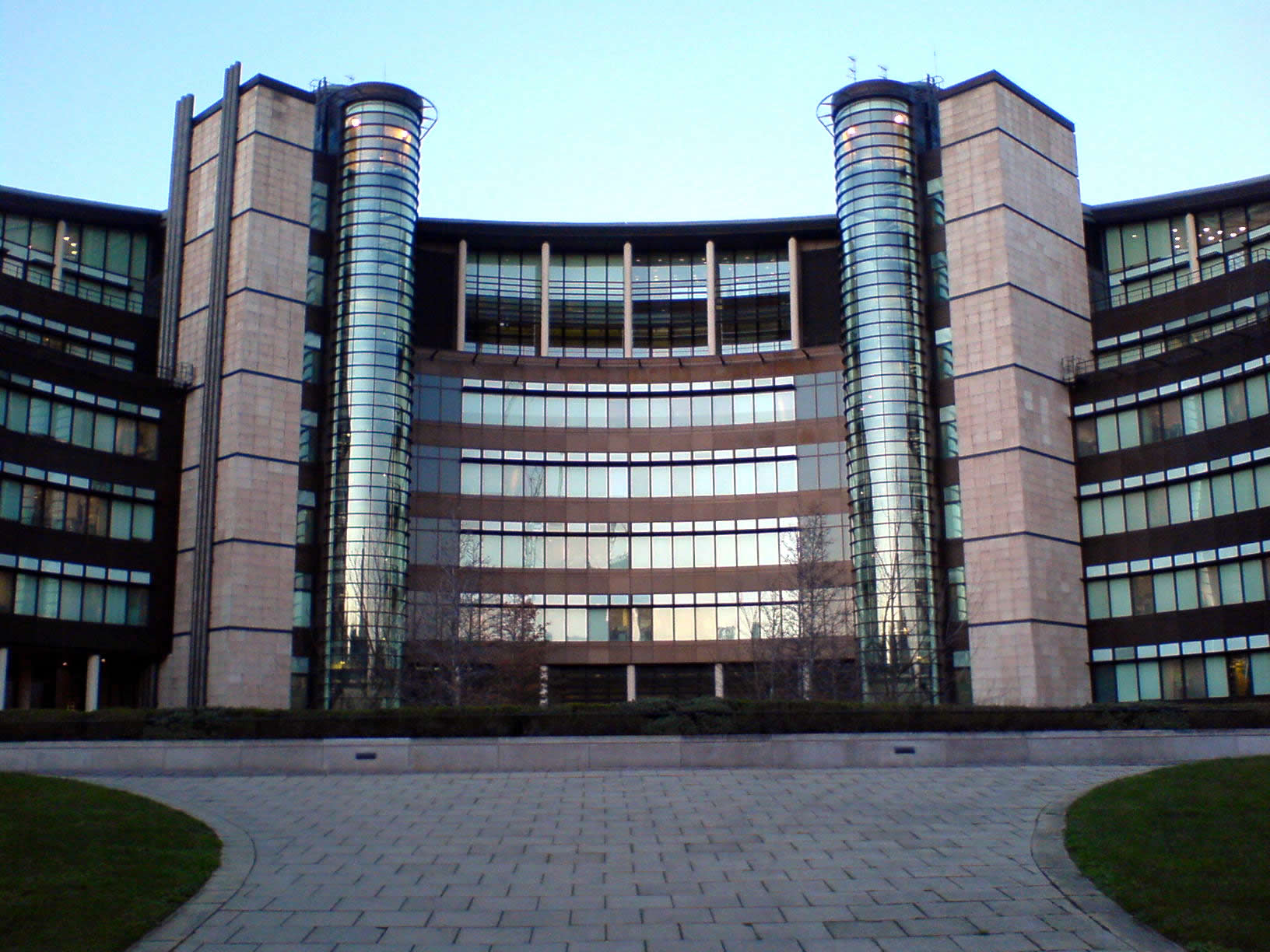
Scottish Widows Headquarters, Morrison Street, Edinburgh

In March 1812, a number of prominent Scotsmen gathered in the Royal Exchange Coffee Rooms in Edinburgh. They were there to discuss setting up 'a general fund for securing provisions to widows, sisters and other female relatives' of fundholders so that they would not be plunged into poverty on the death of the fundholder during and after the Napoleonic Wars. Scottish Widows' Fund and Life Assurance Society opened in 1815 as Scotland's first mutual life office.

Regulations made in 1811 showed its focus on providing annuities for dependants, but this quickly became only a small part of the company's business. They also set eligibility requirements; for example, those over fifty years old or those with a wife more than twenty years younger than himself could not apply.

Scottish Widows granted just 10 policies to female customers in the first four years, as applications from women were rare at the time. One example is Catherine Drummond in 1818, who as an unmarried woman requested annuity of £50 (£4,000 in 2025) once turning sixty years old.

In 1999, Lloyds TSB agreed to buy the society for £7 billion. The society demutualised on 3 March 2000 as part of the acquisition. Scottish Widows became part of Lloyds Banking Group in January 2009 and in November 2013, Lloyds Banking Group sold its asset management division, Scottish Widows Investment Partnership (SWIP) to Aberdeen Asset Management in a £660m deal.

In July 2021 Lloyds Banking Group announced its intention to acquire Embark Group, a fast-growing investment and retirement platform business. Following the deal, the Embark Platform was rebranded as the Scottish Widows Platform and the business announced significant investment plans to make improvements to payment functionality, charging capability and new investment solutions for financial advisers.

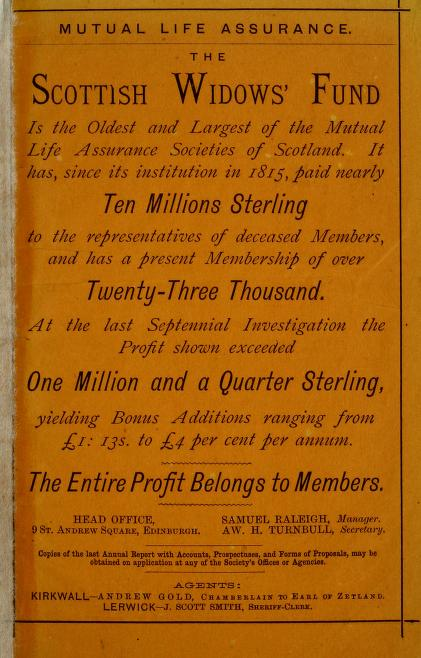
Scottish widows advert from 1878

== Emblems and advertising ==
In 1818, Scottish Widows adopted an emblem created by William Home Lizars, which features the Roman goddess Ceres (Plenty) holding a cornucopia and accompanied by cherubs. A tombstone is seen on her left and a widow kneels on her right with her daughters. This imagery represented the company's goal to support female dependants facing financial loss. The emblem was not only used as the company arms, but also in its policy documents.

In 1832, Sir John Steell was inspired by the 1818 emblem to sculpture figures of a widow, her children, and Ceres into the ornamentation of the company's building in 5 St Andrew Square.

The emblem on the cover of the 1914 Scottish Widows annual report was designed by Walter Crane in 1888. It featured Perseus and Pegasus, a symbol of immortality.

In 1986 the first Scottish Widow appeared in a television advert directed by David Bailey in 1986. Since then, Scottish Widows has made 10 adverts featuring the Scottish Widow.

Four models have portrayed the Scottish Widow, a hooded character featured in the company's advertising. The original Widow, chosen to portray the company's brand values in the 'Looking Good' commercial in 1986, was Deborah Moore, daughter of actor Roger Moore. In 1994, Amanda Lamb took over the role. Hayley Hunt became the third Scottish Widow in 2005. In 2014, the company announced that the fourth Scottish Widow would be Amber Martinez.

Scottish Widows is well-known for its iconic advertising campaigns featuring the “living logo” of a widow in a black hood and cape. This symbol has been a staple of the company’s branding for decades.

In 2024, Scottish Widows began a rebranding initiative to modernise its image, introducing a contemporary logo while maintaining its traditional elements. The rebrand includes updates to digital platforms and advertising materials, ensuring a fresh and modern look for the company.
