= Lloyds Banking Group =

British financial institution

Lloyds Banking Group plc
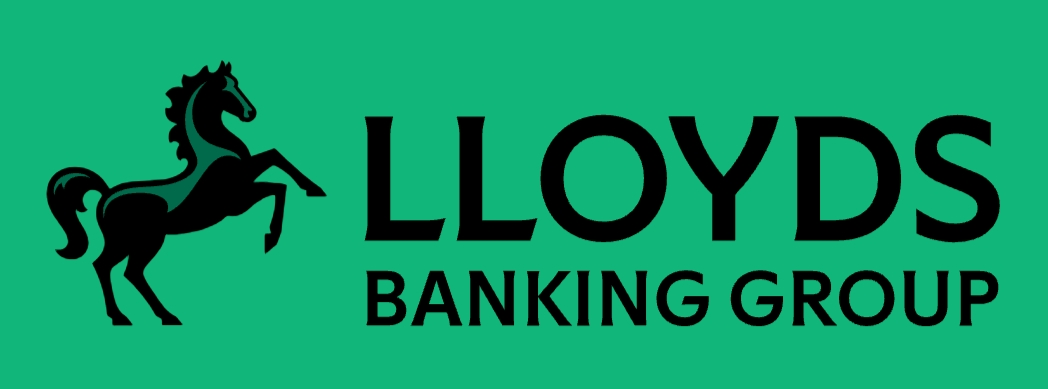

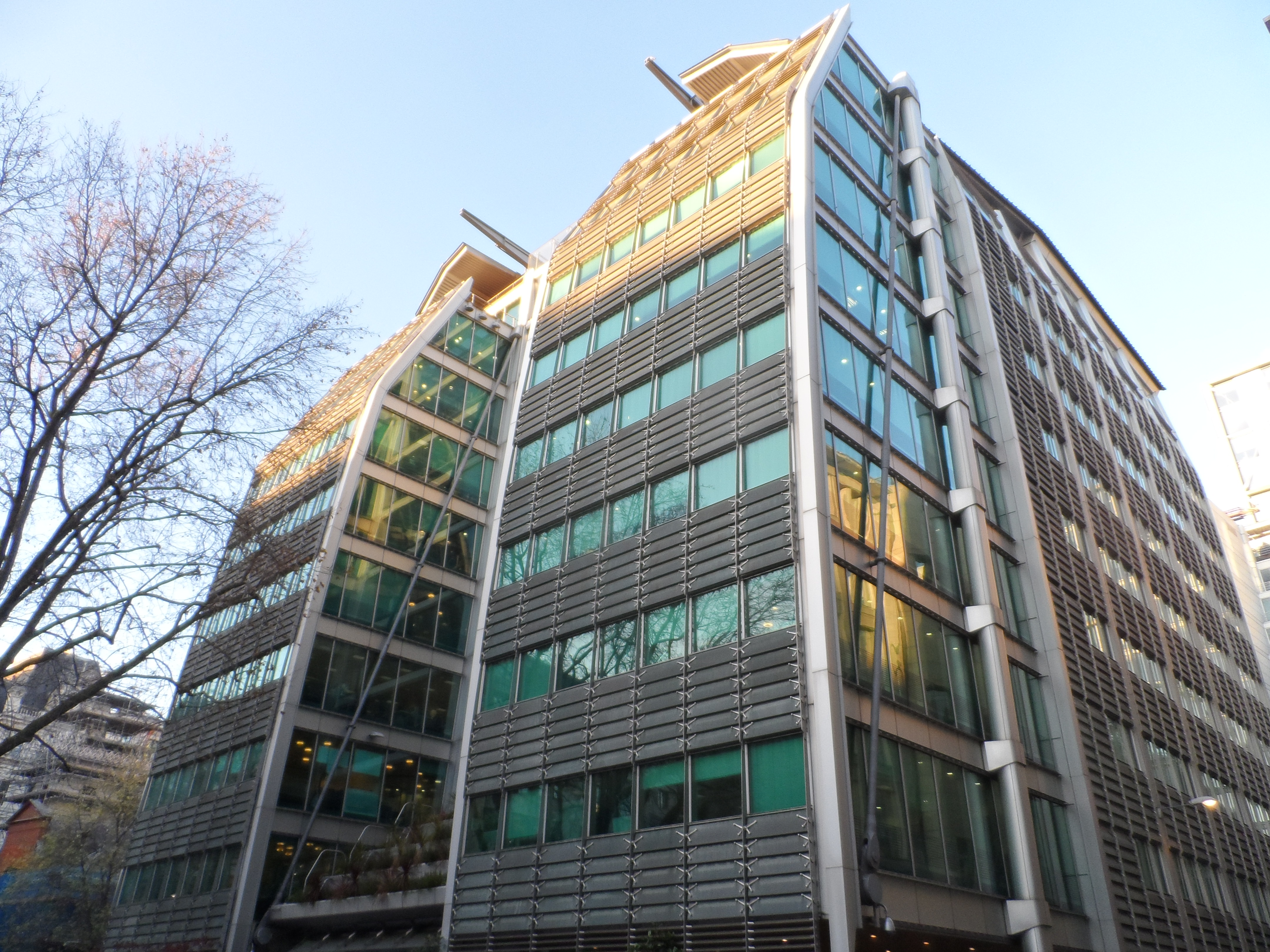
- 25 Gresham Street
- Formerly: TSB Group Public Limited Company (1985–1995); Lloyds TSB Group plc (1995–2009)
- Type: Public
- Traded as: LSE: LLOY; NYSE: LYG; FTSE 100 component
- Industry: Banking; Financial services
- Predecessor: Lloyds line: Lloyds TSB Group; Lloyds Bank (original); Trustee Savings Bank; Cheltenham & Gloucester; Bank of Scotland line: HBOS; Governor and Company of the Bank of Scotland; Halifax plc; Birmingham Midshires
- Founded: 16 January 2009; 17 years ago
- Headquarters: London, England, UK (operational headquarters); Edinburgh, Scotland, UK (registered office)
- Area served: United Kingdom
- Key people: Robin Budenberg (chairman); Charlie Nunn (chief executive)
- Products: Asset management; Retail banking; Commercial banking; Investment banking; Private banking; General insurance; Life assurance; Pensions; Investment management; Wealth Management
- Revenue: ▲£19.422 billion (2025)
- Operating income: ▲£6.661 billion (2025)
- Net income: ▲£4.757 billion (2025)
- Total assets: ▲£944.072 billion (2025)
- Total equity: ▲£47.867 billion (2025)
- Number of employees: 65,000 (2026)
- Divisions: Consumer Lending and Consumer Relationships; Business & Commercial Banking; Corporate & Institutional Banking; Insurance, Pensions & Investments
- Subsidiaries: Lloyds Bank; Bank of Scotland; Scottish Widows; Lloyds Development Capital; Agricultural Mortgage Corporation; Black Horse; Lex Autolease
- Website: lloydsbankinggroup.com

Lloyds Banking Group plc is a British financial institution formed through the acquisition of HBOS by Lloyds TSB in 2009. It is one of the UK's largest financial services organisations, with 30 million customers and 65,000 employees. Lloyds Bank was founded in 1765; the oldest part of the group, the Bank of Scotland, was founded by the Parliament of Scotland in 1695.

The Group's headquarters are located at 33 Old Broad Street in the City of London, while its registered office is on The Mound in Edinburgh. It also operates office sites in Birmingham, Bristol, Manchester, West Yorkshire and Glasgow. The Group also has overseas operations in the US and Europe. Its headquarters for business in the European Union is in Berlin, Germany.

The business operates under a number of distinct brands, including Lloyds Bank, Halifax, Bank of Scotland and Scottish Widows, but in 2026 it announced that the Halifax brand would be discontinued.

Lloyds Banking Group is listed on the London Stock Exchange (LSE) and is a constituent of the FTSE 100 Index. It had a market capitalisation of approximately £51.4 billion as of 24 October 2025—the 15th-largest of any LSE listed company—and has a secondary listing on the New York Stock Exchange in the form of American depositary receipts. It is the 11th largest bank in Europe by total assets as of 2024.

== History ==
=== Origins ===
Lloyds Bank is one of the oldest banks in the UK, tracing its establishment to Taylors and Lloyds founded in 1765 in Birmingham by button maker John Taylor and iron producer and dealer Sampson Lloyd II. Through a series of mergers, Lloyds became one of the Big Four banks in the UK.

Bank of Scotland, which originated in the 17th century, is the second-oldest surviving UK bank after the Bank of England. In 2001, a wave of consolidations in the UK banking market led the former Halifax Building Society—which originated in 1853—to agree to a £10.8 billion merger with Bank of Scotland.

Trustee Savings Bank (TSB) can trace its roots back to the first savings bank founded by Henry Duncan in Ruthwell, Dumfriesshire, in 1810. TSB itself was created in 1985 by an Act of Parliament that merged all the remaining savings banks in England & Wales as TSB Bank plc and in Scotland (except Airdrie Savings Bank) as TSB Scotland plc.

==== Lloyds/TSB merger ====
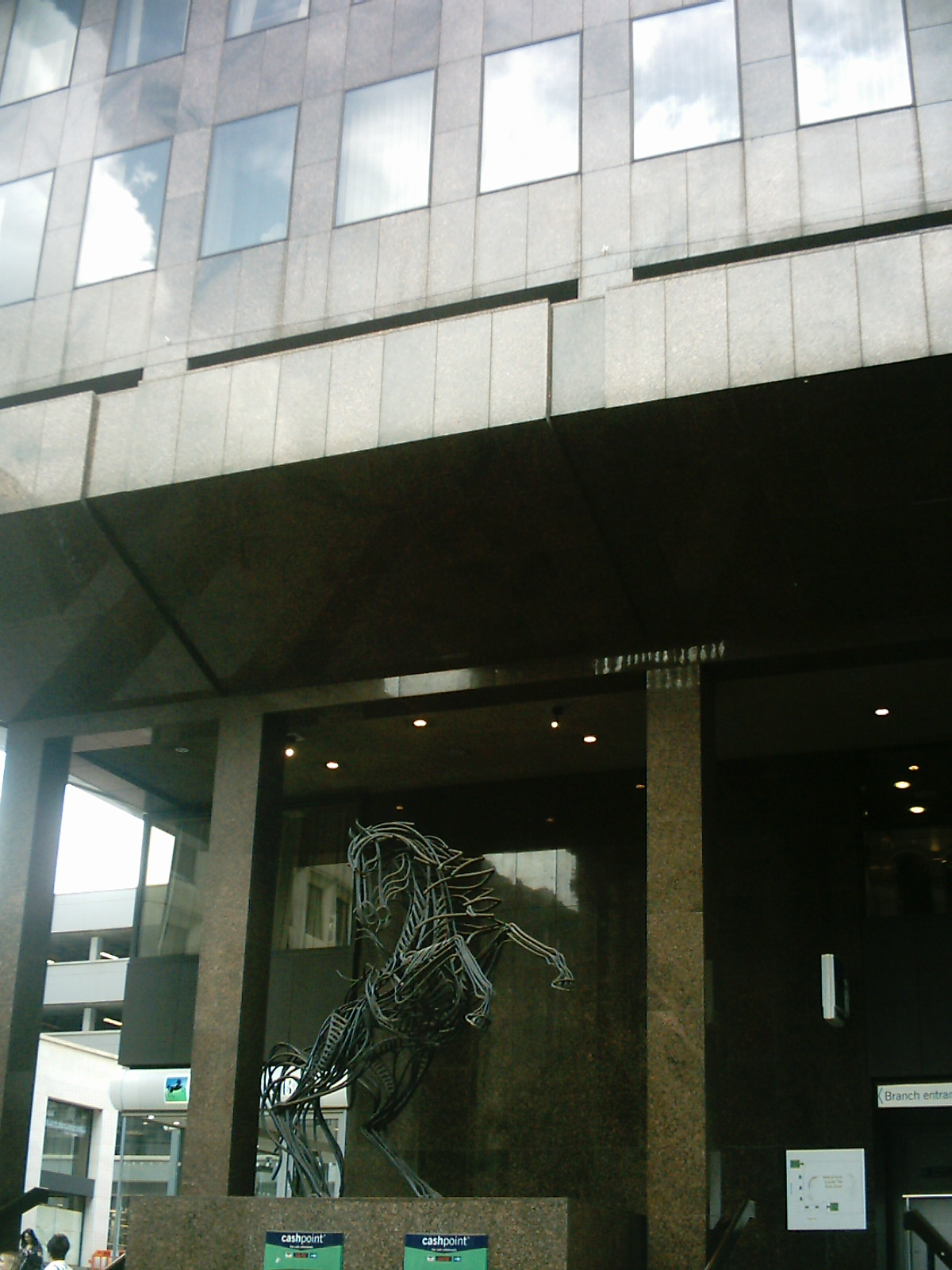
Park Row Leeds branch of Lloyds Bank, with a sculpture of the black horse (called Cancara) in the foreground

In 1995, Lloyds Bank plc merged with TSB Group plc, forming Lloyds TSB Group plc.

In 2000, the group acquired Scottish Widows, a mutual life-assurance company based in Edinburgh, in a deal worth £7 billion. This made the group the second-largest UK provider of life assurance and pensions after Prudential. In September the same year, Lloyds TSB purchased Chartered Trust from Standard Chartered Bank for £627 million to form Lloyds TSB Asset Finance Division, which provides motor, retail and personal finance in the United Kingdom under the trading name Black Horse.

Lloyds TSB continued to take part in the consolidation, making a takeover bid for Abbey National in 2001, which was later rejected by the Competition Commission. In October 2003, Lloyds TSB Group agreed on the sale of its subsidiary NBNZ Holdings Limited—comprising the Group's New Zealand banking and insurance operations—to Australia and New Zealand Banking Group. In July 2004, Lloyds TSB Group announced the sale of its business in Argentina to Banco Patagonia Sudameris S.A. and its business in Colombia to Primer Banco del Istmo, S.A.

On 20 December 2005, Lloyds TSB announced that it had reached an agreement to sell its credit card business Goldfish to Morgan Stanley Bank International Limited for £175 million. In 2007, Lloyds TSB announced that it had sold its Abbey Life assurance division to Deutsche Bank for £977 million.

==== Acquisition of HBOS ====
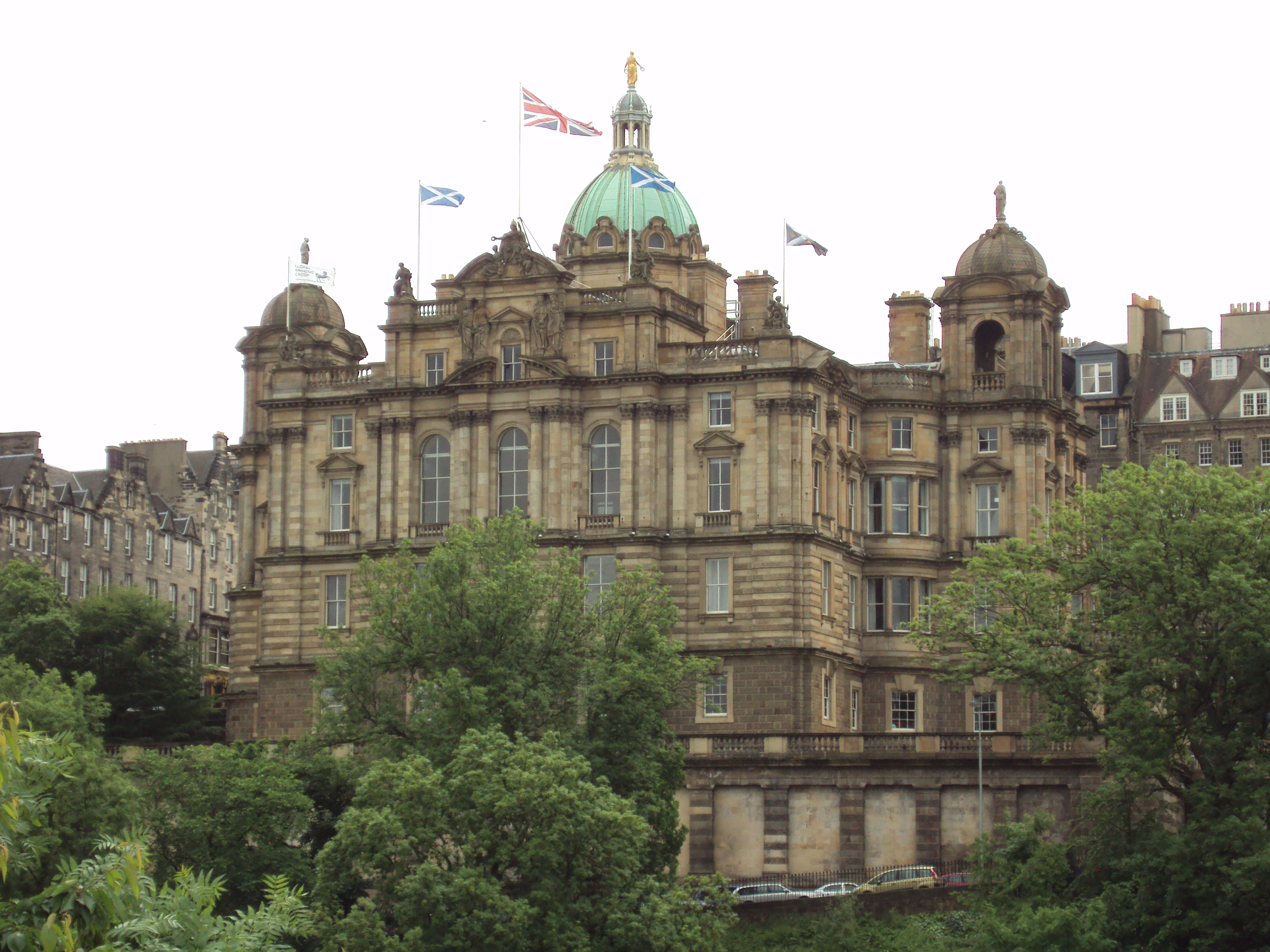
Head office of the Bank of Scotland at The Mound, Edinburgh

On 17 September 2008, the BBC reported that HBOS was in takeover talks with Lloyds TSB, in response to a precipitous drop in HBOS's share price. The talks concluded successfully that evening with a proposal to create a banking giant which would hold a third of UK mortgages. An announcement was made on 18 September 2008.

On 19 November 2008, the new acquisition and government preference share purchase was agreed by Lloyds TSB shareholders. HBOS shareholders overwhelmingly approved the deal on 12 December. Lloyds TSB Group changed its name to Lloyds Banking Group upon completion of the takeover on 19 January 2009.

On 12 February 2009, Eric Daniels, the CEO of the Group, was questioned about the banking crisis during a session of the Treasury Select Committee of the House of Commons. One of the key issues concerned Lloyds' takeover of HBOS and the amount of due diligence carried out before the acquisition. Daniels said that a company would always like to do more due diligence on another company, but there are legal limits on how much is possible before an actual acquisition. Losses were slightly more than the £10 billion originally identified by the due diligence owing to write-offs of property loans because of falling property prices and the lack of demand for it. The then-Chairman of Lloyds, Sir Victor Blank, said in August 2009 that losses had been "at the worst end of expectations" and that the Lloyds board was surprised by the speed at which the losses—which were caused by the unexpectedly sharp contraction of the world economy in late 2008 and early 2009—happened. This position was confirmed by Archie Kane, a senior Lloyds executive in Scotland, in evidence to the Scottish Parliament's economy committee in December 2009.

On 13 February 2009, Lloyds Banking Group revealed that the losses at HBOS exceeded initial estimates, amounting to approximately £10 billion. The share price of Lloyds Banking Group fell 32% on the London Stock Exchange, carrying other bank shares with it.

=== October 2008 to January 2009 ===
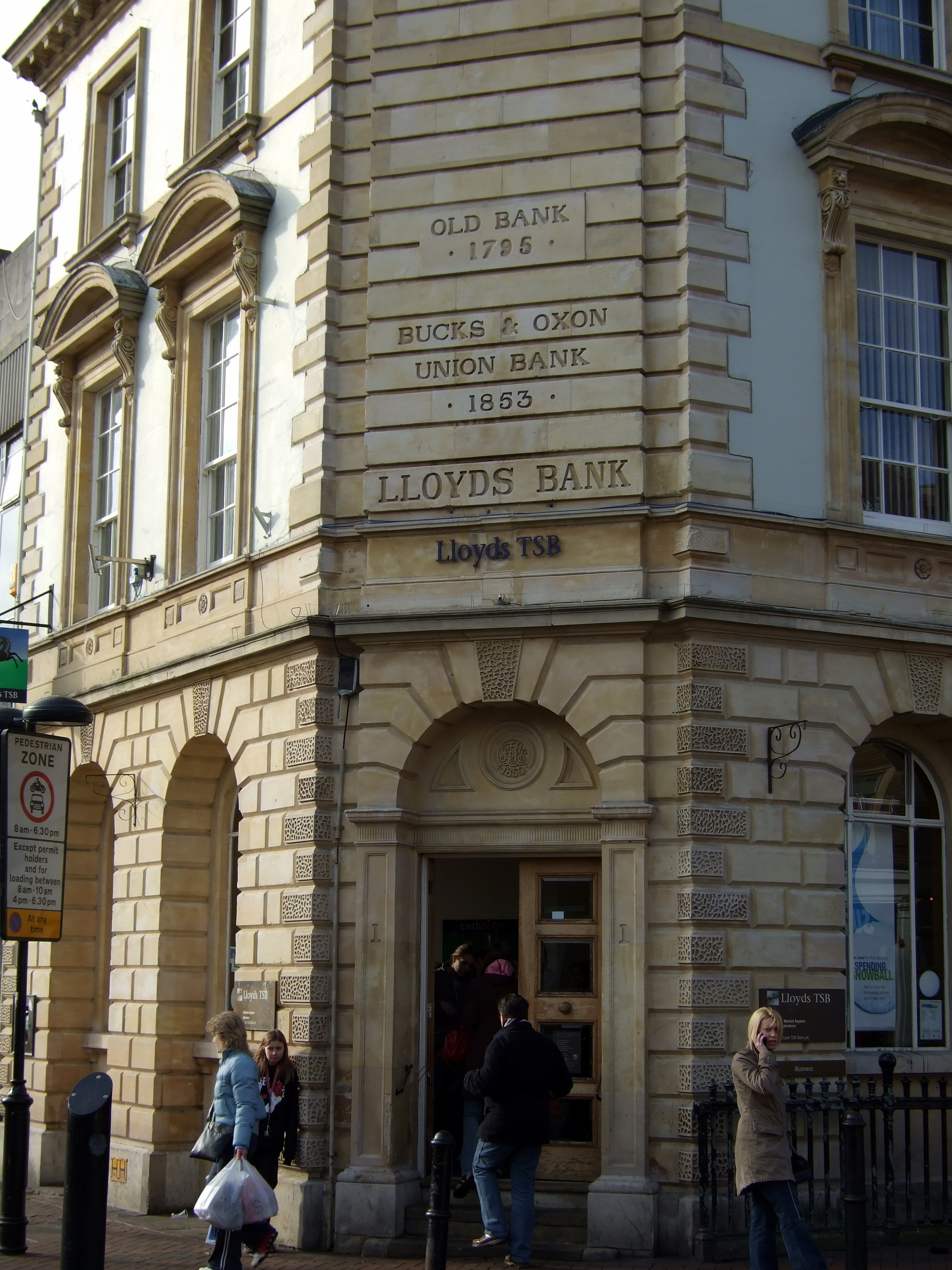
The Aylesbury branch of Lloyds Bank, formerly the Bucks and Oxon Union Bank

On 13 October 2008, Prime Minister Gordon Brown announced a government plan for the Treasury to invest £37 billion (US$64 billion, €47 billion) of new capital into major UK banks—including Royal Bank of Scotland Group, Lloyds TSB and HBOS—to avert a collapse of the financial sector. Barclays avoided taking a capital investment from the UK government by raising capital privately, and HSBC moved capital to its UK business from its other businesses overseas.

It was later confirmed that Lloyds TSB would have been required by the Financial Services Authority (FSA) to take additional capital from the government if it had not taken over HBOS. After the recapitalisations and Lloyds' acquisition of HBOS, the UK government held a 43.4% stake in Lloyds Banking Group.

=== February to June 2009 ===
In February 2009, after it became apparent that the recession would be deeper than originally anticipated, the FSA was instructed to "stress test" the banks against a severe economic downturn. The FSA stated that the assumptions underlying the stress test were not intended to be a forecast of what was likely to happen but to simulate a near-catastrophic economic scenario. These assumptions included:

- A peak-to-trough fall in UK gross domestic product (GDP) of over 6%, with no growth until 2011 and returning to trend-rate growth in 2012;
- A rise in UK unemployment to just over 12%;
- A 50% peak-to-trough fall in UK house prices;
- A 60% peak-to-trough fall in UK commercial property prices.

The conclusion from this exercise was that Lloyds would need additional capital if such a scenario ever occurred. Because the wholesale funding markets were effectively closed at the time, in March 2009 Lloyds made a compromise with the UK government consisting of two elements:

- The first element was the redemption of preference shares. The £4 billion of preference (non-voting) shares held by UKFI were repaid on 8 June 2009 following the issue of new ordinary shares—this avoided the payment of £480 million annual interest to the Treasury and allowed Lloyds to resume payment of dividends when profits allowed. These new ordinary shares were initially available to existing shareholders through an open offer at 38.43 pence that closed on 5 June 2009—87% were taken up. The remaining 13% were placed in the market on 8 June 2009 at 60 pence. This open offer and placing was underwritten by the Treasury; if none of these new ordinary shares had been bought by existing shareholders or the open market, the government—as underwriters of the deal—would have bought them, and their shareholding would have increased to a maximum of 65%. This did not happen; the government's holding remained at 43.4% and Lloyds became the first European bank to repay the government's "credit crunch" investment. Following the government's 43.4% participation in June's Open Offer, the average buying price of the government's total shareholding was 122.6 pence.
- The government implemented an asset protection scheme. Lloyds agreed in principle to enter the government's asset protection scheme to insure it against potential future losses on previous loans—primarily on the old HBOS portfolio. The fee for this would have been paid for by the issue to the government of new 'B' (non-voting) shares, which could have increased the government holding to a maximum of c. 62%—or higher if the government had bought all the ordinary shares issued to redeem the preference shares.

=== June 2009 to present ===
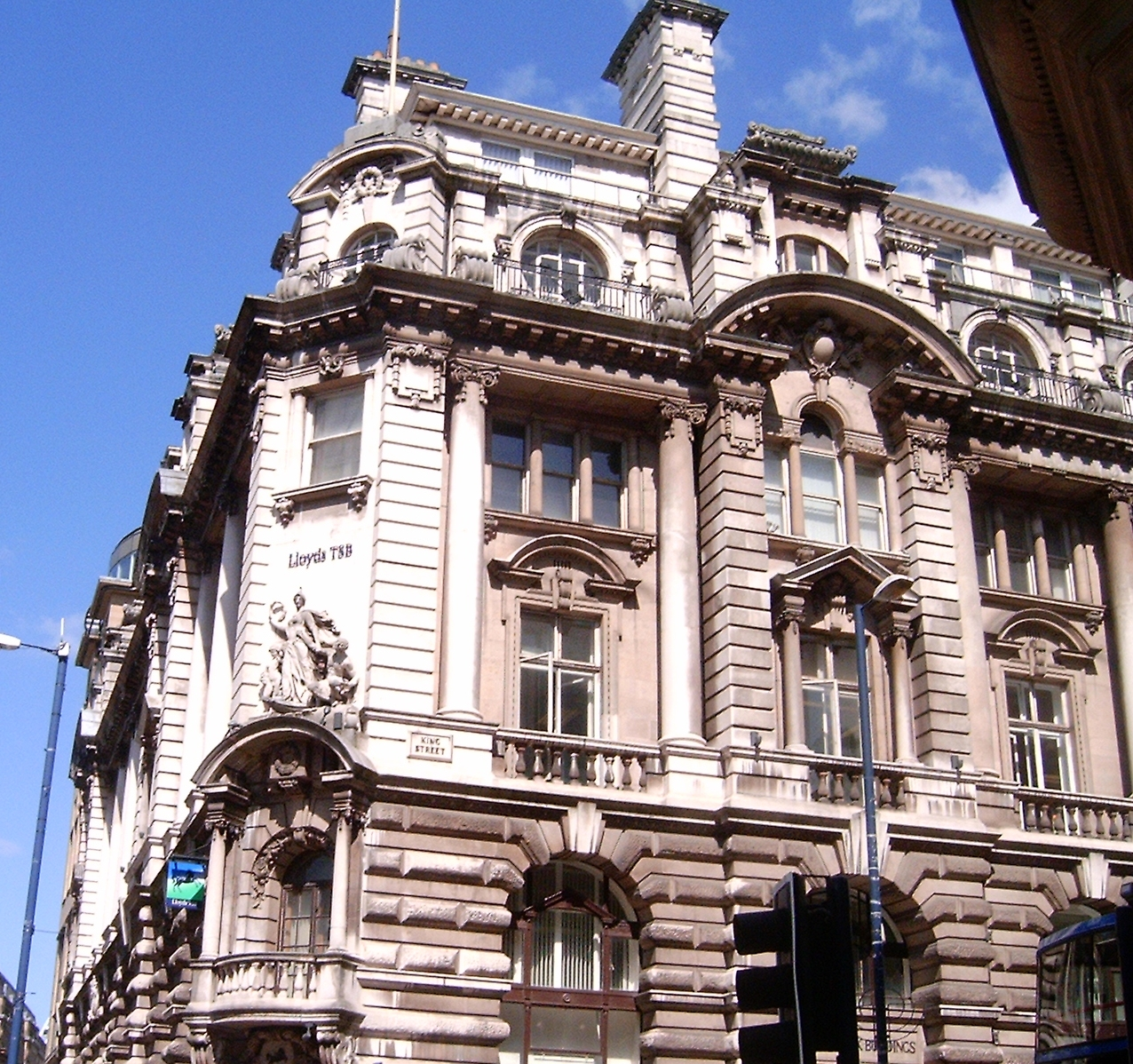
King Street Manchester branch of Lloyds Bank, designed by Charles Heathcote in 1915

Lloyds' impairments peaked in the first half of 2009; by mid-2009 the asset protection scheme increasingly looked like a poor deal for Lloyds. Following negotiations, the government confirmed on 3 November 2009 that Lloyds would not enter the scheme—although RBS still would. Instead, Lloyds launched a rights issue to raise capital from existing shareholders; as an existing 43.4% shareholder, the government chose to take part in this and thus maintained its shareholding at 43.4%. Following this, the National Audit Office calculated the government's average buying price for its entire stake in Lloyds to be about 74 pence.

It was announced in the government's pre-budget report on 9 December 2009 that the forecast for the total loss to taxpayers for all the bank bailouts had been reduced from £50 billion to £10 billion—in part because of the restructuring of the government's asset protection scheme. The final part of the December 2009 capital raise involved issuing new shares to debt holders in February 2010. This diluted existing shareholders—including the UK Government, whose shareholding was reduced from 43.4% to around 41%. The group sold its 70% stake in insurance company Esure to Esure Group Holdings on 11 February 2010. The share was valued at around £185 million. In 2011 then-Chief Executive António Horta-Osório told The Banker, "We will keep the different brands because the customers are very different in terms of attitude".

On 4 November 2012, it was reported that Lloyds was considering selling its 60% stake in St James's Place Wealth Management to raise around £1 billion. In April 2013, Lloyds sold its loss-making Spanish retail operation—originally Banco Halifax Hispania—and the local investment management business in Spain to Banco de Sabadell. Lloyds will receive a 1.8% stake in Sabadell worth about €84 million and an additional sum of up to €20 million over the next five years. In September 2013, it was reported that the UK government was planning to sell up to a quarter of its shares in Lloyds Banking Group. The government sold 6% of its shares on 17 September 2013 at 75p, raising £3.2 billion and reducing its stake to 32.7%. The UK government then sold a further 7.8% on 26 March 2014 at 75.5p, raising a further £4.2bn and reducing its stake to 24.9%. A trading plan of incremental sales during 2015 reduced the publicly owned stake to below 10% by the end of October. Sales resumed in November 2016, as the holding was reduced to 7.99%. On 17 March 2017, the British government confirmed its remaining shares in Lloyds Banking Group had been sold.

In February 2025, Lloyds Banking Group nearly tripled the amount it is setting aside to cover the car finance mis-selling scandal to £1.2bn. Lloyds is one of the lenders who could potentially be forced to compensate consumers after a court ruling in October 2024 determined that paying a “secret” commission to car dealers who had arranged the loans without disclosing the sum and terms of that commission to borrowers was unlawful.

In early 2025, Lloyds Banking Group secured a £99 million contract to provide banking services for HM Revenue & Customs (HMRC), replacing Barclays after a decade.

As of 2025, the bank provided cross-brand service from all branches, allowing customers of Lloyds to use Halifax and Bank of Scotland branches and vice versa.

=== Divestment ===
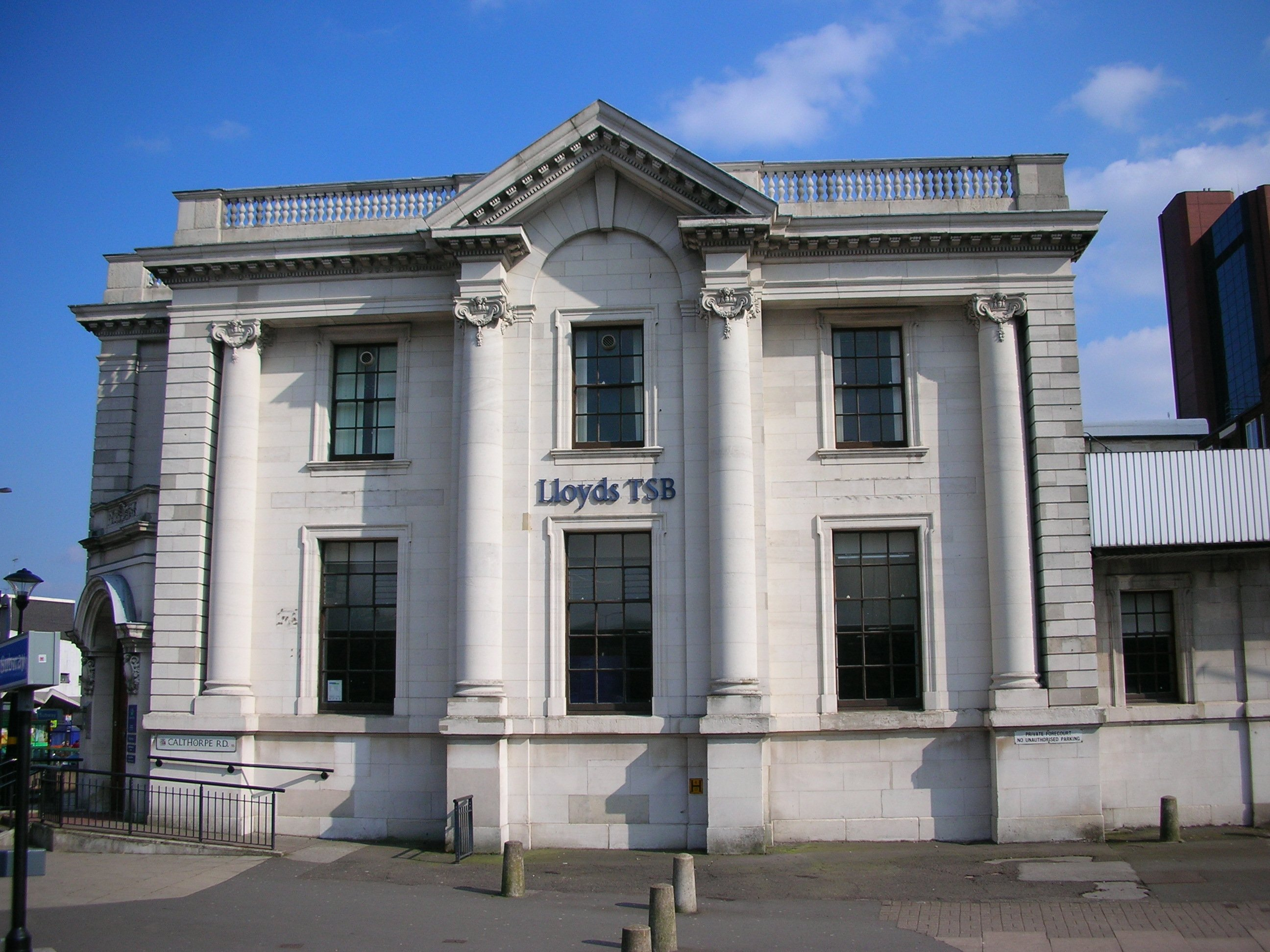
The Edgbaston branch of Lloyds Bank at Five Ways, Birmingham, designed by P. B. Chatwin in 1908

The UK government's purchase of a 43.4% stake in the group in 2009 was considered as state aid; under European Commission competition laws, the group would be required to sell a portion of its business. The group's divestment plan—codenamed "Verde"—identified 632 branches which would be transferred to a new business. Customers with accounts held by the branches, and staff employed within them, would be transferred. The new business would be formed from some Lloyds TSB branches in England and Wales and all branches of Lloyds TSB Scotland plc and Cheltenham & Gloucester plc; these would operate under the TSB brand as TSB Bank plc. The remainder of the Lloyds TSB business would be rebranded as Lloyds Bank.

Lloyds Banking Group reached a Heads of Terms agreement in July 2012 to sell the Verde branches to The Co-operative Bank for £750 million. The final transfer of TSB Bank plc to the new owner was due to be completed by late 2013. In February 2013, it was reported that Lloyds Banking Group was considering a stock market flotation of the TSB business as an alternative, should the transfer not be completed. On 24 April 2013, The Co-operative Bank decided not to proceed with the acquisition because of the economic downturn and the tough regulatory environment imposed on banks. Lloyds Banking Group said that the rebranding to TSB Bank would still take place and that the new bank will be divested through an initial public offering in 2014. TSB Bank began operations on 9 September 2013, under CEO Paul Pester.

Lloyds Banking Group announced that 25% of TSB's shares would be floated on 24 June 2014; however, with the offer being 10 times oversubscribed, 35% of TSB's shares were sold at 260p on 20 June. Banco Sabadell agreed to purchase TSB in March 2015 and completed the acquisition on 8 July 2015. The purchase meant Lloyds sold its final holding in TSB.

== Divisions and subsidiaries ==
The business is divided into five divisions:

- Private equity
- Consumer lending and consumer relationships
- Business & commercial banking
- Corporate & institutional banking
- Insurance, pensions and investments

== Senior leadership ==
Refers to chairmen and chief executives since 2009, when Lloyds Banking Group was formed.

=== Current leadership ===
- Chairman: Sir Robin Budenberg (since January 2021)
- Chief Executive: Charlie Nunn (since August 2021)

=== List of former chairmen ===
1. Sir Victor Blank (2009)
2. Sir Winfried Bischoff (2009–2014)
3. Lord Blackwell (2014–2020)

=== List of former chief executives ===
1. Eric Daniels (2009–2011)
2. Sir António Horta-Osório (2011–2021)

== Sponsorships and responsible business programmes ==
Lloyds Banking Group is an active supporter of disability rights and best practice; it is a Gold member of the Employers' Forum on Disability. In 2010, the group helped create and currently sponsors the Royal Association for Disability Rights (RADAR) Radiate network, which aims to support and develop a talent pool of people with disabilities and health conditions and to potentially act as a source of thinking for organisations on how 'disabled talent' is best spotted and developed.

In 2011, Lloyds Banking Group established the Lloyds Scholars Programme, a social mobility programme aimed at UK students, in partnership with nine leading UK universities. The Scholars Programme takes 15 students per university per year and consists of a £1000 per annum scholarship paid directly to the student to help with living costs, a Lloyds Banking Group mentor and two ten-week internships, paid at £18,000 pro rata. The programme supports students throughout their university career and requires scholars to complete 100 hours of volunteering in their local community per year of their degree. There are also restrictions on who can apply, which exclude medical and veterinary students, as well as anyone with a residual household income as defined by their student funding body of more than £25,000 per annum, since the programme is a social mobility initiative.

== Awards and recognition ==
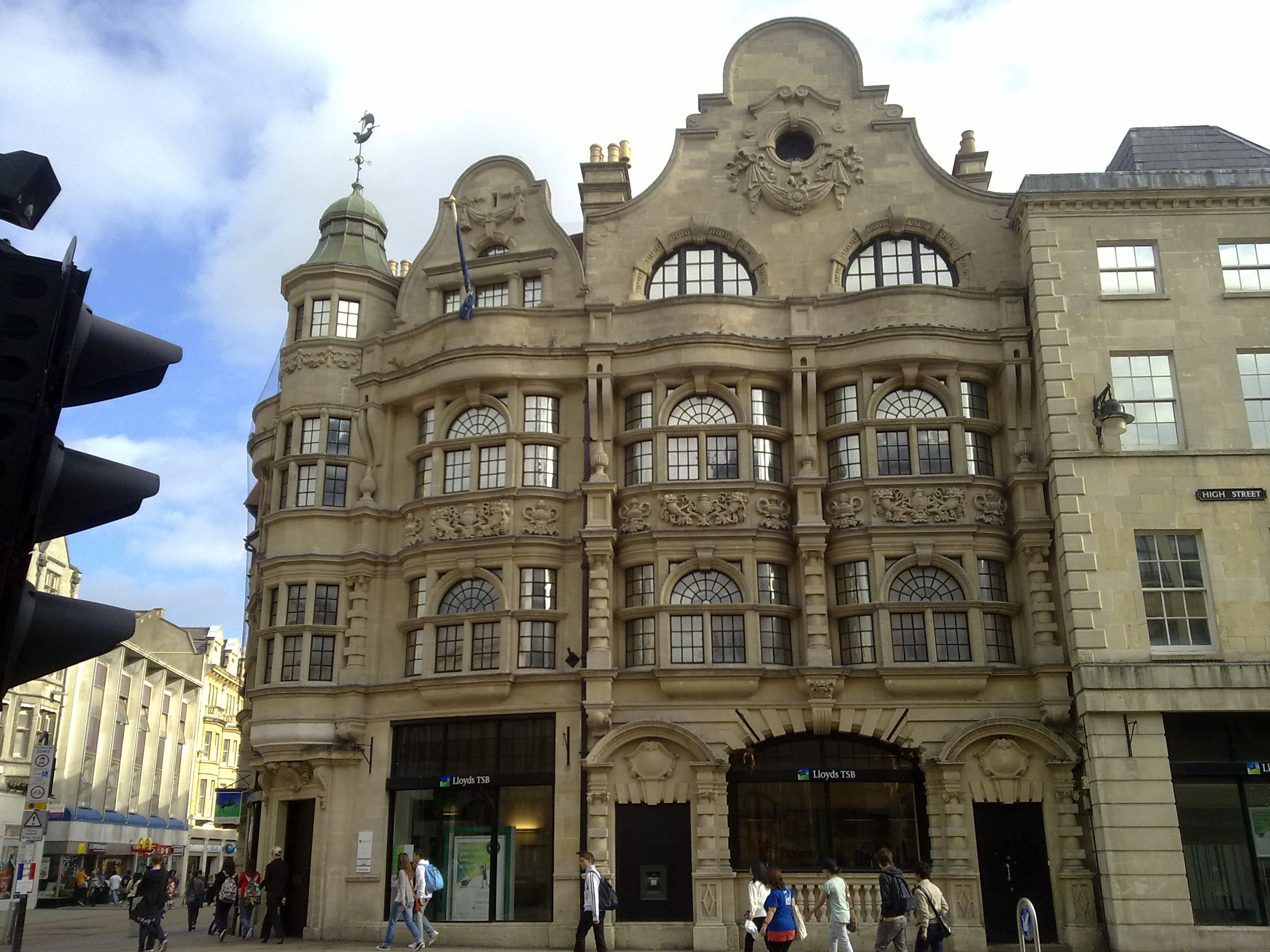
Carfax Oxford branch of Lloyds Bank on High Street, designed by Stephen Salter in 1901

In July 2007, Euromoney announced Lloyds TSB as the winners of its Awards for Excellence.

In June 2008, Lloyds TSB Group came top in the Race for Opportunity's (RfO) annual survey.

In May 2009, Lloyds TSB Corporate Markets was recognised as 'Bank of the Year' for the fifth year running at the Real FD/CBI FDs' Excellence Awards.

In October 2009's "What Investment" magazine awards, Halifax won Best Savings Account Provider, and Halifax Share Dealing was also named Best Share Dealing Service.

In October 2009's "Consumer Money Awards," Halifax won Best First-Time Mortgage Provider. Lloyds' brands were commended in several other categories, including Cheltenham & Gloucester for Best Remortgage Provider and Best High Street Mortgage Provider; Lloyds TSB for Best Current Account Provider, Best Student Account Provider and Best Customer Service Provider; and Halifax for Best ISA Provider and Best High Street Savings Provider.

In November 2009's "Your Mortgage Award," Halifax won the award for Best Overall Mortgage Lender for the eighth year running, as well as Best Large Loans Mortgage Lender. Birmingham Midshires was named Best Specialist and Buy-to-Let Mortgage Lender, and Lloyds TSB won the award for Best Overseas Mortgage Lender.

== Controversies ==
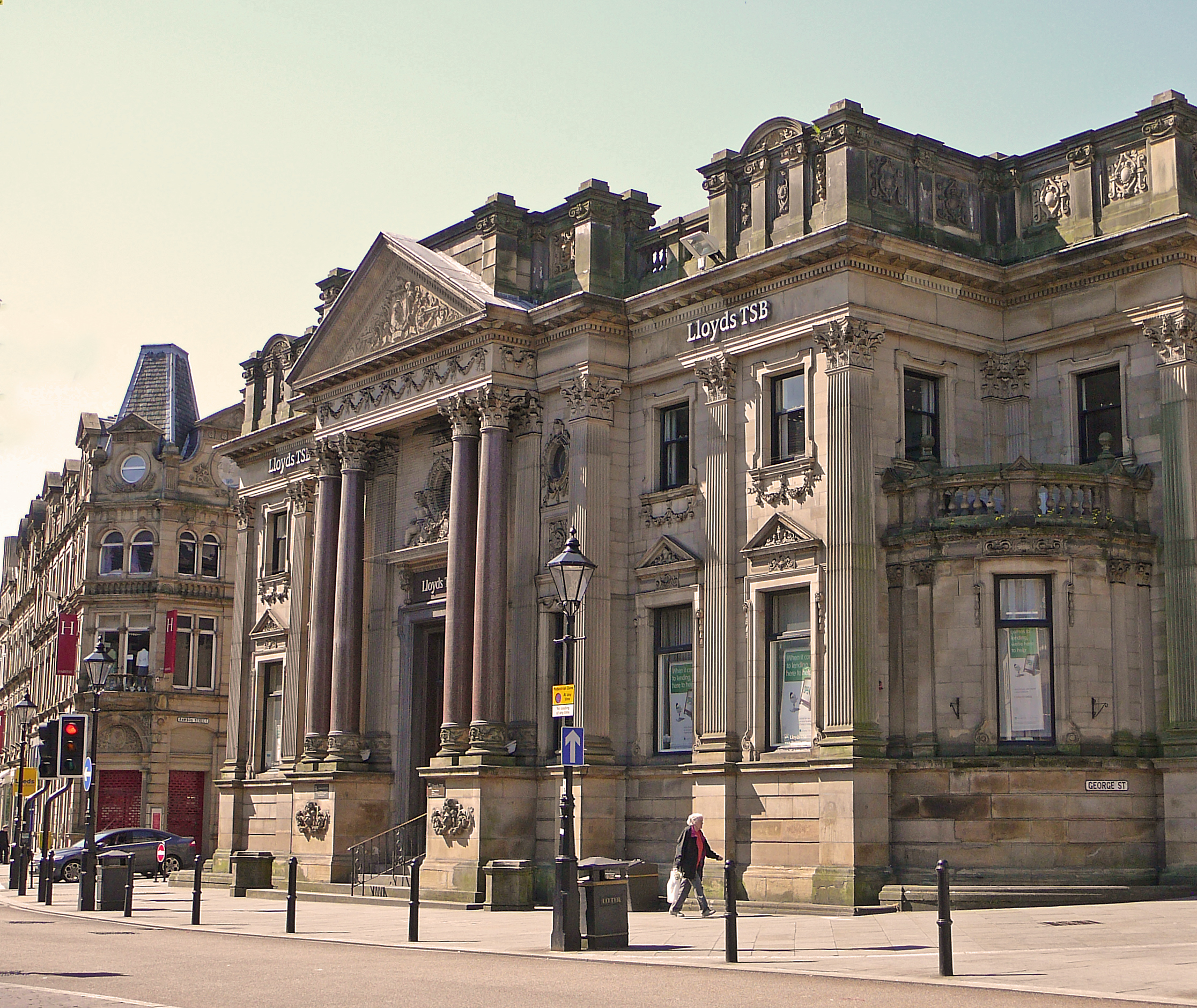
The Halifax branch of Lloyds Bank on George Square, built 1897

=== Money laundering ===
A 2010 report by The Wall Street Journal described how Credit Suisse, Barclays, Lloyds Banking Group, and other banks were involved in helping the Alavi Foundation, Bank Melli, the Government of Iran, and others circumvent US laws banning financial transactions with certain states. They did this by stripping information out of wire transfers, thereby concealing the source of funds. Lloyds Banking Group settled with the US government for US$350 million. The US government's Manhattan District Attorney's Office was involved, although the case was merged with one at the federal US Department of Justice.

=== Tax avoidance ===
In 2009, a case was brought against Lloyds by HM Revenue and Customs on grounds of tax avoidance. Lloyds was accused of disguising loans to American companies as investments in order to reduce the tax liability on them.

=== Complaints via the Financial Ombudsman Service ===
Lloyds TSB received 9,952 complaints via the Financial Ombudsman Service in the last half of 2009. This, when added to the other brands of the Lloyds Banking Group, was twice the number of complaints received by Barclays—the next-most-complained-about UK bank. The Financial Ombudsman Service upheld fewer complaints against Lloyds TSB than it did against Barclays.

=== Islamic Account ===
In 2014, Lloyds launched the 'Islamic Account', a current account aimed at Muslims which it stated was compliant with Sharia law – namely, the prohibition of credit or debit interest. Critics of the new policy stated that the account amounted to religious discrimination, as users of the Sharia-compliant account would not incur interest if they went overdrawn, in contrast with users of typical current accounts. The bank responded that the account was available to both Muslims and non-Muslims and that comparisons of interest rates between its Islamic Account and traditional current accounts were "meaningless".

=== HBOS Reading fraud ===
Lloyds Banking Group has been criticised for failing to compensate, or even apologise to, victims of fraud perpetrated by employees of HBOS. LBG was accused of treating the whistle-blowers involved in the HBOS Reading fraud poorly. Customers Paul and Nikki Turner presented evidence of the fraud to the board but were ignored. Indeed, the bank tried to evict them from their home on twenty-two occasions. Sally Masterton was an accountant working for Lloyds who greatly assisted Thames Valley Police in their investigation of the fraud, codenamed Operation Hornet. She wrote a report on the fraud at the request of the bank, called Project Lord Turnbull. She subsequently left the bank and claimed constructive dismissal.

=== Overdraft fees ===
In January 2019, the Group was criticised by the Chair of the Business, Energy and Industrial Strategy Committee for changes to its overdraft fees policy. Rachel Reeves MP said of the changes that "While [they] might be legal, they are not within the spirit of the FCA's recommendations" to scrap overdraft fees and replace them with a single interest rate and that they would "increase the charges for the vast majority of customers".

=== Motor finance litigation ===
In March 2026, the Financial Times reported that Lloyds Banking Group faced a potential £66 million lawsuit brought by more than 30,000 consumers over alleged mis-selling of car finance agreements. The claim, led by law firm Courmacs Legal against the group’s Black Horse unit, relates to discretionary commission arrangements (DCAs), which were banned by the Financial Conduct Authority (FCA) in 2021 after concerns they incentivized higher interest rates without adequate disclosure to customers.

The case forms part of a wider motor finance investigation in the United Kingdom, with the FCA preparing a redress scheme expected to result in billions of pounds in compensation across the industry.

In April 2026, the Financial Times published that Lloyds will not launch a legal challenge against the UK's compensation scheme to consumers who were mis-sold the car finance agreements.

=== Lloyds Business Support Unit ===
A review conducted by Thames Valley Police indicated that fraud may have been committed at the Lloyds Business Support Unit based in Bristol. Lloyds Banking Group has denied this. There are more than two hundred alleged victims of the unit who have asked the police to investigate their claims.
