= Robin Budenberg =

British corporate adviser

Sir Robin Budenberg CBE

Chairman of Lloyds Banking Group
- Incumbent
- Assumed office 4 January 2021
- Preceded by: Lord Blackwell

Personal details
- Born: Robin Francis Budenberg; 1959 (age 66–67) UK
- Education: University of Exeter
- Occupation: Banker

Sir Robin Francis Budenberg CBE (born 1959) was appointed non-executive Director of Lloyds Banking Group on 1 October 2020 and became Chairman on 4 January 2021.

Budenberg was Chairman of The Crown Estate for 9 years until 9 July 2025.

== Early life ==
Budenberg grew up in Cheshire, where his family owned Budenberg Gauge Company, a maker of pressure gauges and accessories established in Manchester in 1854. Budenberg holds a Bachelor of Law degree from the University of Exeter.

== Career ==
Budenberg started his career with Price Waterhouse where he qualified as a Chartered Accountant and joined SG Warburg in 1984. He was a senior investment banker at UBS Investment Bank where he worked for over 25 years and oversaw the bank's relationship with HM Treasury. He was part of the team that designed the Government Bank Recapitalisation Scheme in October 2008.

From 2010 until January 2014, he was Chief Executive and then Chairman of UK Financial Investments, the UK government body that oversaw the government's investments in financial institutions bailed out during the banking crisis. Budenberg was London Chairman of Centerview Partners between 2015 and 2020 and was also a non executive director of Charity Bank and Big Society Trust

=== Honours ===
He was appointed Commander of the Order of the British Empire (CBE) in the 2015 Birthday Honours for services to the taxpayers and the economy and knighted in the 2023 Birthday Honours for services to the economy.
