= Charlie Nunn =

British banker (born 1971)

- Born: Charles Alan Nunn; September 1971 (age 55)
- Education: University of Cambridge; INSEAD
- Title: CEO, Lloyds Banking Group.
- Term: August 2021-
- Predecessor: António Horta-Osório
- Children: 4

Charles Alan Nunn (born September 1971) is a British banker and former management consultant, and the chief executive (CEO) of Lloyds Banking Group since August 2021.

== Early life ==
Nunn grew up near Southampton, Hampshire. He was educated at Brookfield Comprehensive School and Itchen Sixth Form College. He earned a bachelor's degree in economics from the University of Cambridge, followed by a master's from INSEAD.

== Career ==
Nunn worked for Accenture for 12 years, in the US, France, Switzerland and the UK. Then in 2006, he joined McKinsey & Company as a partner, and worked there for five years.

Nunn joined HSBC in 2011, rising to global head of personal banking and wealth management.

Nunn succeeded António Horta-Osório (who had held the post for a decade) as Lloyds CEO on 16 August 2021. It was announced that he would receive a salary of £5.6 million.

== Personal life ==
Nunn is married, with four children.
