= Cassa Padana =

Italian bank based in Leno, Lombardy

- Native name: Cassa Padana Banca di Credito Cooperativo S.C.
- Formerly: Cassa Rurale ed Artigiana della Bassa Bresciana
- Company type: Società Cooperativa
- Industry: Financial services
- Founded: 1893 (Leno); 1970s (Bassa Bresciana)
- Headquarters: 25 via Garibaldi, Leno, Italy
- Number of locations: 65 branches (2014)
- Area served: Province of Brescia, Lombardy; Province of Bergamo, Lombardy; Province of Cremona, Lombardy; Province of Mantua, Lombardy; Province of Rovigo, Veneto; Province of Verona, Veneto; Province of Ferrara, Emilia-Romagna; Province of Parma, Emilia-Romagna; Province of Reggio Emilia, Emilia-Romagna
- Services: Retail banking
- Net income: ▲€9.309 million (2014)
- Total assets: ▲€2.525 billion (2014)
- Total equity: ▲€247.021 million (2014)
- Owner: ▼11,067 individuals (2014)
- Number of employees: ▲487 (2014 average)
- Capital ratio: 19.16% (CET1)
- Website: Official website (in Italian)
- Footnotes / references source

Cassa Padana Banca di Credito Cooperativo S.C. is an Italian bank based in Leno, Lombardy. The bank served the area around Brescia (Val Camonica and Val Trompia) and 8 other provinces of northern Italy.

In terms of branches, the bank is the fourth largest bank among the Federazione Italiana delle Banche di Credito Cooperativo - Casse Rurali ed Artigiane (Federcasse), behind Banca di Credito Cooperativo di Roma, Banca del Territorio Lombardo (71 branches in 2016), and Banca d'Alba. However, in terms of total assets (of 2014), the bank was behind BCC Roma, Banca d'Alba, Banca del Territorio Lombardo (pro forma data), Credito Cooperativo Ravennate e Imolese, Emilbanca, Banca Credito Cooperativo di Brescia, Banca di Credito Cooperativo di Carate Brianza, Banca Centropadana, and ChiantiBanca. According to the same research by Ricerche e Studi, the bank was ranked 56th among all types of banks (despite some banks being omitted from the study). The bank was also a member of the Federazione Lombarda delle Banche di Credito Cooperativo (6.23% stake).

== History ==
Cassa Rurale ed Artigiana della Bassa Bresciana was formed in the 1970s by the merger of Cassa Rurale e Artigiana di Leno (found 1893), Cassa Rurale e Artigiana di Gambara (found 1891), and Cassa Rurale e Artigiana di Seniga e Pescarolo (found 1897). In 1993, the bank changed its name to Cassa Padana after absorbing Cassa Rurale e Artigiana di Gussola. The bank absorbed "BCC Camuna" in 2010, "Banca Veneta 1896" and "BCC Valtrompia" in 2011.

In 2016, due to the banking reform of BCC banks (Law N°49/201), the bank planned to demutualize itself by forming a subsidiary, Cassa Padana S.p.A., leaving the co-operative society as a parent company only. However, in May 2017, the bank changed to join the Cassa Centrale Banca Banking Group.

== Equity interests ==
Cassa Padana owned minority interests in ICCREA Holding (1.35%), Banca Popolare Etica (0.23%), Investitionsbank Trentino Südtirol – Mediocredito Trentino Alto Adige (0.06%), Cassa Centrale Banca - Credito Cooperativo del Nord Est (0.00%) and Centrale Finanziaria del Nord Est (0.38%).

== See also ==
- Banco di Brescia
- Banca Credito Cooperativo di Brescia
- Banca Popolare di Brescia
- Banca di Valle Camonica
- Banca del Territorio Lombardo
- Banca Valsabbina
