= List of European cooperative banks =

This list of European cooperative banks includes individual cooperative banks, integrated cooperative banking groups, and loose nationwide networks, the latter typically tied together by an institutional protection scheme.

== Overview ==
European cooperative banks have developed since the mid-19th century, principally on the basis of early pioneering initiatives in the German confederation led by Franz Hermann Schulze-Delitzsch and Friedrich Wilhelm Raiffeisen. The German model was emulated in France from 1878 (1882 in German-ruled Alsace–Lorraine), in Italy from 1883, in Austria-Hungary from 1886, in the Netherlands from 1895, and in Spain from 1901. Similar developments occurred in other European countries.

Cooperative banks expanded dynamically in Europe during the 20th century. In some instances, they have largely or entirely demutualized, as in the case of Italy's banche popolari in the 2010s. Conversely, some banking groups that were not originally organized as cooperatives have eventually adopted that form, such as France's Groupe Caisses d'Épargne (now part of BPCE) in 1999.

The European Association of Co-operative Banks, initially established in 1970 as the Association of Cooperative Savings and Credit Institutions of the European Economic Community, is the sector's umbrella association, based in Brussels.

== Austria ==
- Alpen Privatbank
- Austrian Raiffeisen Banking Group
- Volksbank Group

== Bulgaria ==
- Bulgarian Development Bank
- Bulgarian Postbank
- MKB Unionbank

== Belgium ==
- KBC Group

== Denmark ==
- Nykredit

== Finland ==
- OP Financial Group
- POP Bank Group
- S-Bank

== France ==
- Crédit Agricole
- Crédit Mutuel
- BPCE Group

== Ireland ==
- EBS d.a.c.
- Irish League of Credit Unions
- Nationwide UK (Ireland)

== Italy ==
- Alpen Privatbank
- Banca Agricola Popolare di Ragusa
- Banca Centropadana
- Banca d'Alba
- Banca del Territorio Lombardo
- Banca di Credito Cooperativo di Roma
- Banca di Credito Popolare di Torre del Greco
- Banca Popolare del Frusinate
- Banca Popolare del Lazio
- Banca Popolare di Bari
- Banca Popolare di Cividale
- Banca Popolare di Puglia e Basilicata
- Banca Popolare di Sondrio
- Banca Popolare Pugliese
- Banca Popolare Sant'Angelo
- BCC Iccrea Group
- Credito Cooperativo Ravennate, Forlivese e Imolese
- Gruppo Cassa Centrale Banca
- South Tyrolean Raiffeisen Group

== Luxembourg ==
- Banque Raiffeisen

== Netherlands ==
- Rabobank

== Poland ==
- BPS Group
- SGB Group
- Bank Spółdzielczy w Brodnicy in Brodnica
- Krakowski Bank Spółdzielczy and Bank Spółdzielczy Rzemiosła w Krakowie, both in Kraków
- Bank Spółdzielczy w Bydgoszczy in Bydgoszcz
- Wschodni Bank Spółdzielczy w Chełmie in Chełm
- Warmińsko-Mazurski Bank Spółdzielczy in Olsztyn
- Bank Spółdzielczy w Rutce – Tartak in Suwałki
- Spółdzielcza kasa oszczędnościowo-kredytowa or Polish credit unions

== Portugal ==
- Crédito Agrícola Group
- Caixa de Crédito Agrícola Mútuo de Bombarral
- Caixa de Crédito Agrícola Mútuo da Chamusca
- Caixa de Crédito Agrícola Mútuo de Leiria
- Caixa de Crédito Agrícola Mútuo de Mafra
- Caixa de Crédito Agrícola Mútuo de Torres Vedras
- Caixa Económica da Misericórdia de Angra do Heroísmo

== Romania ==
- Banca Creditcoop

== Spain ==
- Grupo Caja Rural
- Cajamar Cooperative Group
- Solventia Cooperative Group
- Eurocaja Rural
- Caja Rural de Guissona
- Laboral Kutxa
- Caja de Ingenieros
- FIARE Banca Ética, a branch of Italy's Banca Popolare Etica

== Sweden ==
- JAK Members Bank

== Switzerland ==
- AEK Bank 1826
- Raiffeisen (Switzerland)

== United Kingdom ==
- Credit unions in the United Kingdom
- Building Societies Association
- The Money Co-op
- Progressive Building Society
- Scottish Building Society
- Shared Interest

For a full list of members of the Building Societies Association, see here: Building_Societies_Association#Members,

== See also ==
- Central Cooperative Bank, a Bulgarian commercial bank despite its name
- Unico Banking Group, a defunct attempt at cross-border integration of cooperative banks
- List of banks in Europe
