= Banca del Territorio Lombardo =

Coordinates: 45°25′53.6″N 9°59′18.7″E

- Native name: Banca del Territorio Lombardo S.C.
- Formerly: Cassa Rurale di Depositi e Prestiti di Pompiano; Banca di Credito Cooperativo di Pompiano e della Franciacorta
- Company type: Società Cooperativa
- Industry: Financial services
- Founded: 1919
- Headquarters: 12 Piazza S. Andrea, Pompiano, Italy
- Number of locations: 71 branches (2016)
- Area served: Lombardy region
- Services: Retail banking
- Net income: ▲€2,117,845 (2014)
- Total assets: ▲€2,770,172,396 (2014)
- Total equity: €311,925,768 (2014)
- Owner: ▲4,230 individuals (2014)
- Number of employees: ▲281 (2014)
- Capital ratio: 17.74% (CET1)
- Website: Official website (in Italian)
- Footnotes / references based on the balance sheet of BCC Pompiano

Banca del Territorio Lombardo is an Italian cooperative bank based in Pompiano, Lombardy.

In terms of branches, the bank is the second largest bank (as of 2016) among the Federazione Italiana delle Banche di Credito Cooperativo - Casse Rurali ed Artigiane (Federcasse), behind Banca di Credito Cooperativo di Roma.

Based on total assets (of 2014), the bank (in pro forma basis), was behind BCC Roma and Banca d'Alba among the member of Federcasse. According to the same research by Ricerche e Studi, BCC di Pompiano e della Franciacorta was ranked 51st among all types of banks, with BCC di Bedizzole Turano Valvestino was ranked the 165th. (despite some banks were omitted from the study). The bank was also the member of Federazione Lombarda delle Banche di Credito Cooperativo (4.15% stake in 2016). The bank also owned a minority interests in ICCREA Holding (1.64% in 2014).

== History ==
Cassa Rurale di Depositi e Prestiti di Pompiano was found in 1919. The bank absorbed Cassa Rurale ed Artigiana di Roccafranca in 1976 and Cassa Rurale ed Artigiana di Castelcovati in 1994. In 1990s the bank was renamed as Banca di Credito Cooperativo di Pompiano e della Franciacorta. In 2016 the bank absorbed Banca di Credito Cooperativo di Bedizzole Turano Valvestino (found 1895).

== See also ==
- Banco di Brescia
- Banca Credito Cooperativo di Brescia
- Banca Popolare di Brescia
- Cassa Padana
- Banca di Valle Camonica
- Banca Valsabbina
