= FinecoBank =

Italian bank

- Formerly: GI-FIN; Istituto per le Cessioni del Quinto; Novara ICQ; ICQ Banca Cisalpina; Fin-Eco Banca ICQ
- Type: Listed
- Traded as: BIT: FBK; FTSE MIB Component
- Industry: Financial services
Founded
1982	(as GI-FIN)
1999	(as Fineco)
- Headquarters: Milan, Italy
- Key people: Alessandro Foti (CEO and General Manager); Paolo Di Grazia (Co-General Manager)
- Services: online brokerage
- Revenue: ▲€1,316 million (2025)
- Net income: ▼€647 million (2025)
- Total assets: ▲€37,295 million (FY 2025)
- Number of employees: 1,529 (2025)
- Website: finecobank.com

FinecoBank S.p.A., known as FinecoBank or just Fineco is an Italian bank that specializes in online brokerage. Launched in 1999 with its Fineco Online service for retail traders, Fineco became a listed company in 2014 and has been independent from UniCredit banking group since 2019.

FinecoBank is a constituent of FTSE MIB (since 2016), the blue chip index of the Borsa Italiana. Since 2015 it has over a million customers in Italy, where its role has been compared to that of Schwab in USA.

FinecoBank has been designated in 2021 as a Significant Institution under the criteria of European Banking Supervision, and as a consequence is directly supervised by the European Central Bank.

== History ==
=== Predecessors ===
The predecessor of Fineco was a financial institution known as GI-FIN S.r.l. in 1982 and then GI-FIN S.p.A. from October 1982. In 1983, the institution was incorporated as Istituto per le Cessioni del Quinto S.p.A. (ICQ), which later known as Novara ICQ S.p.A. and then ICQ Banca Cisalpina S.p.A.. ICQ Banca Cisalpina was a subsidiary of Banca Popolare di Novara (BP Novara). In 1990–91, BP Novara owned 51.21% shares of ICQ Banca Cisalpina. ICQ Banca Cisalpina was also a listed company, which was delisted in 1996 by its new owner Banca Popolare di Brescia (Bipop).

In 1999, Bipop merged with Cassa di Risparmio di Reggio Emilia (Carire) to form Bipop Carire. As of 1990, Banca Popolare di Brescia also partially owned the namesakes Fin-Eco Leasing (33.33%) and Fin-Eco Factoring (30%). As of 1994, Bipop owned the aforementioned companies via an intermediate holding company Fin-Eco Holding. The Holding also owned another subsidiary Fin-Eco SIM. Bipop also attempted to acquire another namesake Cisalpina Gestioni in 1994.

After the 1999 merger, the banking group re-organized ICQ Banca Cisalpina as well as Fin-Eco Leasing and Fin-Eco Factoring.

=== FinecoBank ===
ICQ Banca Cisalpina was renamed to "Fin-Eco Banca ICQ S.p.A." (Banca Fin-Eco in short) in 1999, which was considered as the launch date of the current Fineco. In 2002, Bipop Carire and Fineco became part of Capitalia banking group. In 2007, Capitalia was absorbed into UniCredit banking group, while Fineco was kept as a separate subsidiary.

In 2014 FinecoBank started its initial public offering. In 2016 UniCredit sold a further 30% shares to public market. In May 2019, UniCredit sold another 17% shares of FinecoBank. As UniCredit owned 18% shares of FinecoBank after the transaction, FinecoBank is no longer an associate company of UniCredit.

In 2020, Fineco decided to spend 7 million euros on a marketing campaign to grow its services in UK, whose launch was authorised earlier in the same year.

FinecoBank Banca Fineco serves customers in the United Kingdom and Italy.

UniCredit sold its remaining stake in FinecoBank in 2019.

== Business activities ==
Fineco operates as a multichannel bank, combining banking, financial intermediation and investment services through digital channels and a network of financial advisers. Its activities are organised into three areas: banking, brokerage and investing.

In the banking area, the bank offers different types of current accounts, payment services, debit, credit and prepaid cards, as well as credit products including mortgages, personal loans and overdraft facilities. Its services are distributed mainly through online and mobile platforms, integrated with customer support services and its network of financial advisers.

The brokerage area includes the execution of client orders and access to financial markets. It provides trading in instruments including stocks, bonds, exchange-traded funds (ETFs), certificates, futures, options and contracts for difference (CFDs). In 2025, Fineco ranked first by volume of shares traded in rankings compiled by AMF Italia for intermediaries operating on Borsa Italiana markets.

The investing area covers the distribution and placement of investment products, financial advice, private banking, insurance and pension products, and asset management activities.

== Shareholders ==
As of 2026

Shareholder	Stake (% of ordinary shares)
BlackRock, Inc.	9.2%
Schroders plc	5.06%
FMR LLC	4.98%

== Financial data ==
Year	Revenue (€ million)	Net profit (€ million)	Total net sales (€ million)	Total Financial Assets (TFA) (€ million)	CET1 ratio (%)
2025	1,316.5	647.0	13,440.6	160,551.7	23.30%
2024	1,316.5	652.3	10,082.7	140,765.8	25.91%
2023	1,237.6	609.1	8,792.4	122,556.5	24.34%
2022	947.6	428.5	10,259.3	106,557.9	20.82%
2021	803.8	380.7	10,651.1	107,915.4	18.80%

== See also ==
- List of banks in the euro area
- List of banks in Italy
