= Raiffeisen-Landesbank Tirol =

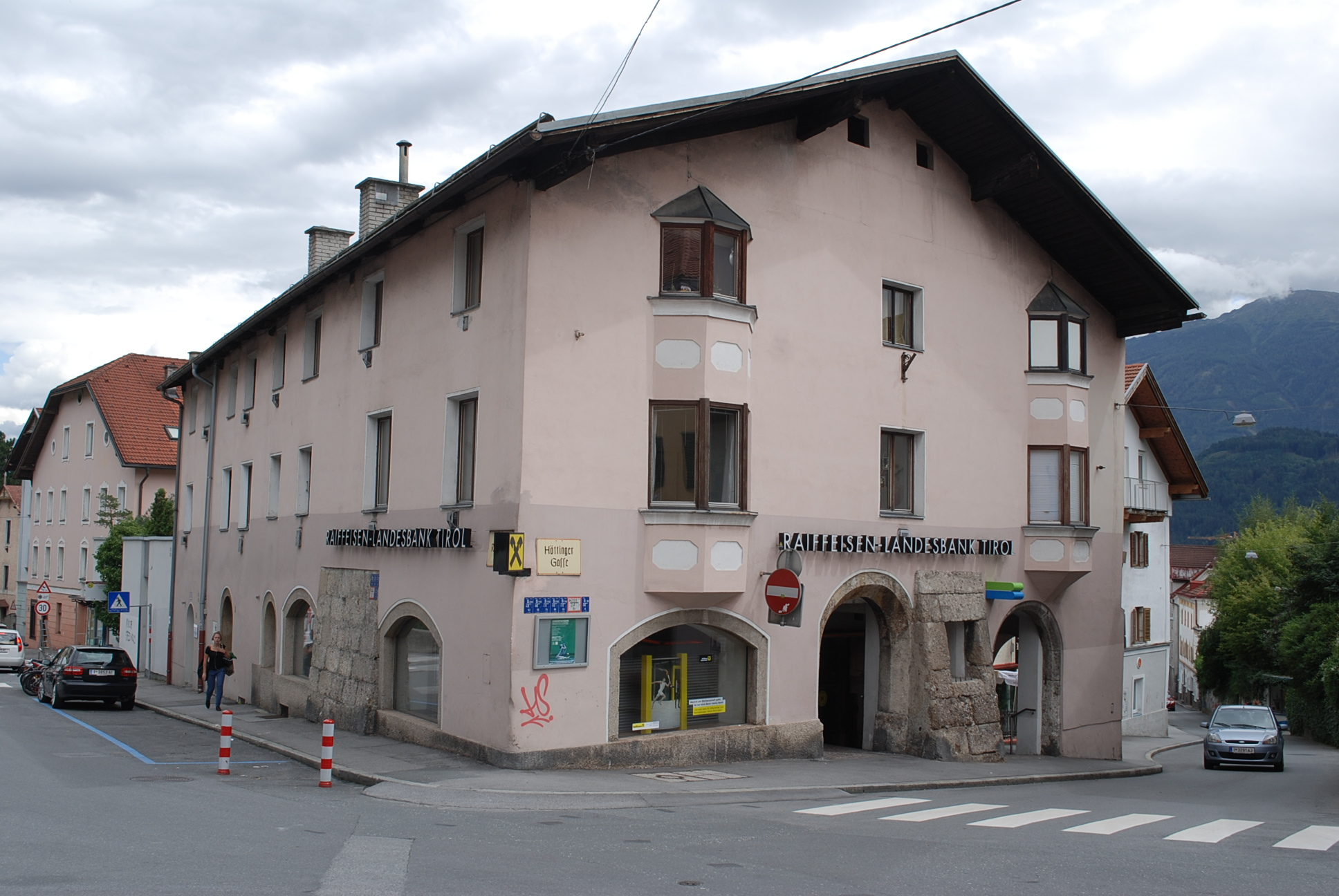
- a branch of Raiffeisen-Landesbank Tirol
- Native name: Raiffeisen-Landesbank Tirol A.G.
- Company type: Aktiengesellschaft
- Industry: Financial services
- Founded: 1894
- Headquarters: 1–7 Adamgasse, Innsbruck, Austria
- Number of locations: 17 branches (2014)
- Area served: Tyrol
- Net income: ▲€8,499,522 (2014)
- Total assets: ▼€7,079,104,943 (2014)
- Total equity: ▲€385 million (2014)
- Owner: 80 locals Raiffeisenbank of Tyrol
- Number of employees: 373.8 (2014 average)
- Subsidiaries: AlpenBank (joint venture 49.99%)
- Capital ratio: 12.52% (CET1)
- Website: rlb-tirol.at
- Footnotes / references source

Raiffeisen-Landesbank Tirol A.G. (lit. 'Raiffeisen State Bank of Tyrol') is an Austrian grouping of cooperative banks based in Innsbruck, Tyrol. The bank is the central institute of Raiffeisenbank in Tyrol. The bank is a member of Raiffeisen Bankengruppe (as one of the eight Raiffeisen-Landesbank of Austria), which is a member of Österreichischer Raiffeisenverband, and in turn a member of Internationale Raiffeisen-Union.

The bank was one of the shareholders of Raiffeisen Bank International (for 3.7% of shares), the national central bank of Austrian Raiffeisenbank.

The bank also formed a joint venture AlpenBank with its Italian counterpart: Raiffeisen Landesbank Südtirol – Cassa Centrale Raiffeisen dell'Alto Adige.

== See also ==
- List of banks in the euro area
- List of banks in Austria
