= Bank of Rome =

Bank of Rome may refer to:

- Banca Romana
- Banco di Roma
- Banca di Roma
- Cassa di Risparmio di Roma
- Banca di Credito Cooperativo di Roma

== See also ==
- Banco di Santo Spirito
- Bank of Italy
- Institute for the Works of Religion
