= Banca Popolare di Brescia =

Former Italian bank

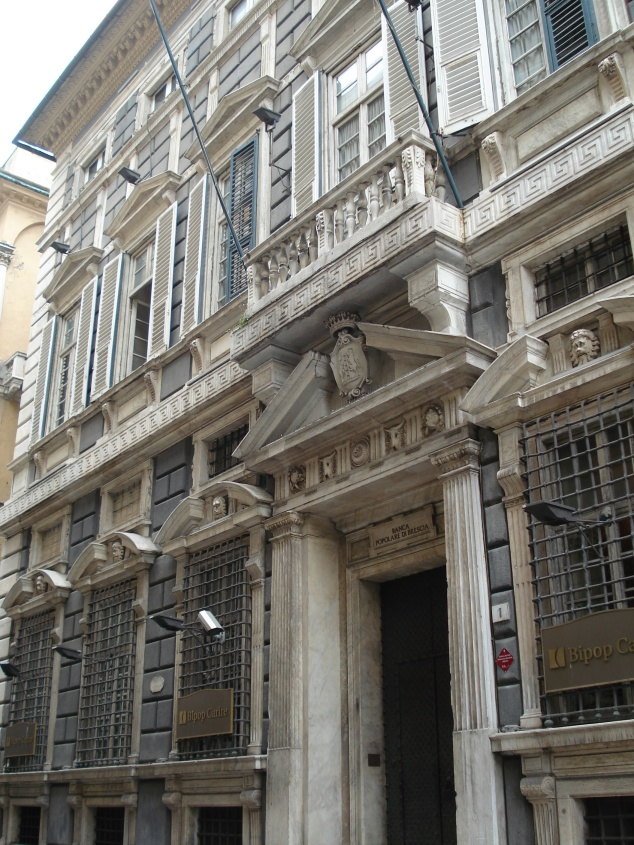
Palazzo Cambiaso Pallavicini in Genoa, branch of Banca Popolare di Brescia

Banca Popolare di Brescia S.c.r.l., also referred to as Bipop, was an Italian cooperative bank based in Brescia, Lombardy. In 1999 the bank merged with Cassa di Risparmio di Reggio Emilia (Carire) to form Bipop Carire.

According to Mediobanca, the bank was ranked 30th in terms of client deposits in 1998 (€5,735,732 thousands). In 1999, the bank had a share capital of 600,847,375,000 lire (about €310 million).

== History ==
Banca Popolare di Brescia was found in 1983 by the merger of Banca Popolare di Lumezzane and Banca Popolare di Palazzolo. The bank was the parent company of Fineco Holding (77.4% stake in 1994). The bank acquired Cisalpina Gestioni from Area Gestioni Finanziarie (30%), Area Consult SIM (6.15%), Banca Popolare di Intra (13.65%), Banca Popolare di Luino e Varese (13.65%) and Banca Popolare di Abbiategrasso (13.65%) in 1994 (renamed to Fineco Gestioni SGR in 2002; merged with Fineco Asset Management SGR in 2004; renamed to Capitalia Asset Management SGR on 1 January 2006).

In 1999 the bank merged with Cassa di Risparmio di Reggio Emilia to form Bipop Carire. On 1 July 2002 Bipop Carire was merged with Banca di Roma to form Capitalia, which was acquired by UniCredit in 2007.

== See also ==
- Banco di Brescia
- Banca Credito Cooperativo di Brescia
- Cassa Padana
- Banca di Valle Camonica
- Banca del Territorio Lombardo
- Banca Valsabbina
- List of banks in Italy
