= Banque Raiffeisen =

Bank of Luxembourg

- Company type: Cooperative Bank
- Founded: 1926
- Headquarters: 4, rue Léon Laval, Leudelange, Luxembourg
- Key people: Guy Hoffmann (Chairman of the Board of Directors) Yves Biewer (Chairman of the Management Board)
- Products: Retail, private and corporate banking; insurance; investment management
- Total assets: 9.641 Mio EUR (2020)
- Number of employees: 639 (2020)
- Website: www.raiffeisen.lu

Banque Raiffeisen is a Luxembourgish banking and financial services company. Founded in 1926, it is one of the oldest banks in Luxembourg. The bank is independent from foreign shareholders. It is a member of the International Raiffeisen Union (IRU), which is an association of cooperatives based on the ideas of Friedrich Wilhelm Raiffeisen.

== History ==
Since its creation in 1926, Raiffeisen Luxembourg has become the first independent cooperative bank in the Grand-Duchy, covering the entire national territory.

In 1970, The Luxembourg Raiffeisen network accounted 138 caisses across the country.

As of 2013, Banque Raiffeisen has about 50 sales points all over the country; 11 of them depending directly from the bank, the others belonging to the 13 Caisses Raiffeisen controlled by the bank. Banque Raiffeisen has been designated as a "less significant institution" since the entry into force of European Banking Supervision in late 2014, and as such is directly supervised by the Commission de Surveillance du Secteur Financier.

Banque Raiffeisen has evolved from a rural union to a universal financial institution, covering retail activities but also specialising in business, private banking and wealth management.

== Art Contest ==
In collaboration with other cooperative banks in Europe, namely Raiffeisen (Switzerland), Raiffeisen Zentralbank Austria, the German Cooperative Financial Group in Germany, Raiffeisen Südtirol in Italy, Crédit Mutuel in France and OP Financial Group in Finland. Banque Raiffeisen organizes an annual art contest for young people between 4 and 18 years. In Luxembourg, the drawing contest is called Raiffeisen Molconcours.

== Events ==
Banque Raiffeisen organizes an annual conference on financial markets in collaboration with Vontobel.

== Charity ==
Banque Raiffeisen supports Luxembourgish charities including: Croix-Rouge , Ligue HMC, Fondation Cancer, SOS Villages d’enfants du Monde, SOS Faim and the FLEK – Fleegeelteren an hir Kanner, Lëtzebuerg.

== See also ==
- List of banks in the euro area
- List of banks in Luxembourg
- List of European cooperative banks
