= Pop group =

Pop group may refer to:

- a band that plays some genre of popular music
- a band that plays pop music (a particular genre of popular music)
- The Pop Group, a British post-punk band
- Pop! (group), a 2000s UK pop group
- POP Bank Group, a banking group in Finland
