= Investitionsbank Trentino Südtirol – Mediocredito Trentino Alto Adige =

Mediocredito Trentino – Alto Adige
- Native name: Mediocredito Trentino – Alto Adige S.p.A.; Investitionsbank Trentino Südtirol A.G.
- Formerly: Istituto per l'Esercizio del Credito a Medio e Lungo Termine nella Regione Trentino – Alto Adige
- Company type: public private joint venture
- Industry: Financial services
- Founded: 13 March 1953
- Founder: Italian government
- Headquarters: 1 via Paradisi, Trento, Italy
- Number of locations: 2 headquarters and 4 branches (2015)
- Area served: Trentino, South Tyrol, Lombardy, Veneto and Emilia-Romagna
- Key people: Franco Senesi (chairman); Leopoldo Scarpa (general manager)
- Net income: ▼ (€6,792,038) (2015)
- Total assets: ▼€1,343,882,561 (2015)
- Total equity: ▼€181,286,022 (2015)
- Owner: C.R.–Raiffeisen Finanziaria (35.207%); Trentino – South Tyrol (17.489%); South Tyrol (17.489%); Trentino (17.489%); Südtiroler Sparkasse (7.802%)
- Number of employees: 85 (2015)
- Subsidiaries: Paradisidue S.r.l. (100%)
- Capital ratio: ▲17.84% (CET1)
- Website: Official website
- Footnotes / references in separate balance sheets

Mediocredito Trentino – Alto Adige (German: Investitionsbank Trentino Südtirol) is an Italian investment bank based in Trento, Trentino. The bank served historically the autonomous provinces of Trentino and South Tyrol, but now extended to Lombardy (Brescia), Veneto (Treviso and Padua) and Emilia-Romagna (Bologna).

== History ==
Istituto per l'Esercizio del Credito a Medio e Lungo Termine nella Regione Trentino – Alto Adige (Mediocredito Trentino – Alto Adige in short) was found in 1953 as a statutory corporation. At that time banks were separated from providing short-term loan and medium and loan term loan, which several Mediocredito was set up to enhance the post war recovery. The Ministry of the Treasury provided 800 million lire (54%) and Trentino – South Tyrol Region 450 million lire (36%). Due to Legge Amato the bank became a Società per Azioni (limited company), with a share capital of 66.240 billion lire. It was later increased to 112,470,400,000 lire, or €58,484,608.

== Shareholders ==
- public entity
  - Trentino – South Tyrol (17.489%)
  - Trentino (17.489%)
  - South Tyrol (17.489%)
- banks
  - Casse Rurali Raiffeisen Finanziaria (Cassa Centrale Banca - Cassa Centrale Raiffeisen dell'Alto Adige joint venture) (35.207%)
  - Südtiroler Sparkasse – Cassa di Risparmio di Bolzano (7.802%)
  - Südtiroler Volksbank – Banca Popolare dell'Alto Adige (2.895%)
  - Banca di Credito Cooperativo di Roma (ex-Banca Padovana) (0.213%)
  - ITAS Mutua (0.196%)
  - Banca del Veneziano (0.192%)
  - CentroMarca Banca (plus ex-Cassa Rurale ed Artigiana di Treviso) (0.146%)
  - Banca Alto Vicentino (0.107%)
  - Crediveneto (0.107%)
  - Banca Santo Stefano (0.085%)
  - Veneto Banca (0.085%)
  - Rovigo Banca (0.078%)
  - Banca di Credito Cooperativo di Marcon (0.071%)
  - Banca Sviluppo (0.071%)
  - Cassa Padana (0.064%)
  - Banca Veronese Credito Cooperativo di Concamarise (0.043%)
  - Banca di Credito Cooperativo delle Prealpi (0.043%)
  - Cassa Rurale e Artigiana di Vestenanova (0.043%)
  - Federazione Trentina della Cooperazione (0.043%)
  - Federazione Veneta delle Banche di Credito Cooperativo (0.043%)
  - Cassa Centrale Banca - Credito Cooperativo del Nord Est (0.001%)
  - Raiffeisen Landesbank Südtirol – Cassa Centrale Raiffeisen dell'Alto Adige (0.001%)

== See also ==
- Cassa del Trentino
