= Villa Wollemborg =

Historic villa in Loreggia, Italy

- Aerial view of the villa and park
- Interactive map of the Villa Wollemborg area
- Alternative names: Villa Polcastro, Wollemborg

General information
- Status: In use
- Location: Loreggia, Province of Padua, Veneto, Italy, Via Aurelia 2
- Coordinates: 45.5908739°N 11.9453032°E
- Year built: Early 16th century

Villa Wollemborg, officially listed by the Veneto Region as Villa Polcastro, Wollemborg, is a historic villa in Loreggia, in the Province of Padua, Italy. Dating from the early 16th century, the building is surrounded by a landscape park redesigned by Giuseppe Jappelli in the 19th century.

== History ==
The villa was built in the early 16th century by the Polcastro family and was altered between the 17th and 19th centuries. Much of its present appearance derives from work carried out for the 1818 marriage of Count Girolamo Polcastro and Caterina Cecilia Querini Stampalia.

After Polcastro's death in 1839, his property passed to his wife, Caterina. Her estate subsequently passed to her brother, Giovanni Querini Stampalia, and, following his death in 1869, to the Fondazione Querini Stampalia. In 1870, the foundation sold the villa and its estate at Loreggia to the Wollemborg family.

The property was acquired by Giuseppe Wollemborg, the father of Leone Wollemborg. Leone spent long periods at the estate and later settled there permanently. His direct knowledge of agricultural conditions around Loreggia contributed to his later work in rural cooperation. The Gomiero family acquired the villa in 1970.

== Architecture and park ==
The complex consists of a classically styled main block, with the south-facing facade overlooking the garden, and a 17th-century wing adjoining the building.

Jappelli redesigned the park according to the principles of the 19th-century landscape garden. The Dizionario Biografico degli Italiani lists the "Polcastro Wollemborg garden" among the parks created by the architect and dates it to 1840. The attribution and the property's changes of ownership are also documented in a study of the history of credit cooperation in Veneto.

== Regional recognition ==
Under a decree dated 9 July 2021, the Veneto Region entered Villa Polcastro, Wollemborg in the regional register of Venetian villas participating in the Carta dei servizi, in the section Ville luoghi della cultura (villas as places of culture). In the catalogue of the Istituto Regionale Ville Venete, the complex is identified by the code A0500000540.

== See also ==
- Giuseppe Jappelli
- Leone Wollemborg
