= Caja de Ingenieros =

- Company type: Cooperative bank
- Industry: Financial services
- Founded: 1967; 59 years ago
- Headquarters: Vía Layetana, 39, Barcelona, Catalonia, Spain
- Key people: Joan Cavallé (CEO)
- Products: Banking services
- Revenue: 7,771,000,000 euro (2020)
- Net income: 26,500,000 euro (2025)
- Number of employees: 512 (2021)
- Website: www.caixa-enginyers.com

Caja de Ingenieros (Catalan: Caixa d'Enginyers) is a cooperative society for the savings and credit that has more than 145,000 members and developed a model of personal, commercial, institutional and business banking in the Spanish region focusing on the service for professionals, namely engineers and other professions.

== Overview ==
Founded in 1967, the distinctive feature of the Caja de Ingenieros cooperative model is that the partner is both client and owner of the entity. Clients have to join one of two cooperatives: Usuarios de Caja de Ingenieros or Caja de Ingenieros.

Caja de Ingenieros acts as the parent company of the Caja de Ingenieros Group, which includes:

- Caja de Ingenieros Gestión (fund management company)
- Caixa de Ingenieros Vida y Pensiones (insurance, reinsurance and pension fund management company)
- Caja de Ingenieros Banca-Seguros (insurance operator)
- Caja de Ingenieros Foundation (CSR tool)
- Ingenium Shopping (consumer cooperative)
- Norbolsa (a company specializing in stock exchange brokerage and value-added financial services).

In February 2011 Caja de Ingenieros founded the Caja de Ingenieros Foundation with the purpose of promoting its corporate social responsibility activities. It is a private and non-profit institution that emerged from the transformation of the former Socio-Cultural and Technological Association of Engineers. The Foundation intends to optimize the efficiency of the resources for the promotion of engineering and activities of cultural, social, environmental, beneficial-assistance, professional and technological interest.

The social help includes donation of 2 million euros for projects, 105 scholarships and prizes, educational courses for unemployed people, training for members, etc.

== Politics ==
During the 2017–18 Spanish constitutional crisis, Caja de Ingenieros and Caixa Guissona were the only banks that did not relocate their nominal headquarters out of Catalonia. While its president Josep Oriol Sala claims to not get into politics, critics have pointed that Joan Vallvé i Ribera is both a member of the Foundation board and second vice-president of the Catalan association Òmnium Cultural, which supported several pro-independence demonstrations.

== See also ==
- List of European cooperative banks
- List of banks in Spain
