= Unico Banking Group =

- Formation: 1977
- Dissolved: 2017
- Headquarters: Brussels
- Official language: English
- Secretary General: Geert van der Horst
- Key people: Wolfgang Kirsch, Chairman of the Unico Board
- Website: https://www.unicobankinggroup.eu/

Unico Banking Group was a partnership of eight European co-operative banks founded in 1977 and effectively wound down in 2017.

The group's members were significant players in their respective markets covering a wide range of financial services from retail and corporate banking to investment and merchant banking. The link joining them was a shared co-operative background; however, each individual organisation pursued its own strategy domestically and internationally. The group members benefited by exchanging strategic views, offering each other business opportunities, and sharing expertise and experience

In 2014, the Unico co-operation actively participated in the fields of climate bonds (in close co-operation with the European Investment Bank) and SME finance.

== History ==
Unico Banking Group was founded by six co-operative European banks in 1977. In 1997 the Group was formally registered as an EEIG (European Economic Interest Group) and today the group is composed of eight members.

In the late 1970s, internationalisation of the financial sector began gaining momentum, but Unico members did not at that time have strong networks of their own abroad. They therefore began working together in areas such as payments, the flow of documentation and capital market transaction/syndications. The banks involved also referred customers to one another on occasions when a customer could be better served by a partner bank abroad.

In the past, the idea of intensifying the co-operation within Unico in the form of a European Co-operative Bank was discussed, though this did not happen. An attempted merger between the German DG Bank (now DZ BANK), and Rabobank International in the late 1990s and early 2000 failed. This was largely because of the differences in structures and cultures between the banks.

Toward the end of the 1990s the Unico Banks developed UniCash and Unico Car Lease. The latter project ended in 2009 when results failed to meet expectations and competition between the members in the different countries increased.

In 2008, at the start of the financial crisis, the Unico banks were the first to resume unsecured lending of up to three months at the London interbank offered rate (Libor) in an effort to kick start interbank lending.

In 2017 the members concluded that their differences were too big to come to a beneficial cooperation and the governing bodies were unable to find points of common interest. It was decided to wind down the operations and cancel the general secretariat.

== Members ==
- Banco Cooperativo Espagnol (Spain)
- Crédit Agricole S.A. (France)
- DZ Bank (Germany)
- ICCREA Holding (Italy)
- OP Financial Group (Finland)
- Rabobank (The Netherlands)
- Raiffeisen Bank International (Austria)
- Raiffeisen Bank Switzerland

== Past leaders ==
Chairmen of the Unico Banking Group:

Name	Bank	Period
Pierre Lardinois	Rabobank	1977-1981
Hellmuth Klauhs	GZB Vienna (today Raiffeisen Zentral Bank)	1982-1986
Bernard Auberger	Crédit Agricole	1987-1988
Herman Wijffels	Rabobank	1989-1993
Bernd Thiemann	DG BANK (today DZ BANK)	1994-1998
Walter Rothensteiner	(today Raiffeisen Zentral Bank)	1998-2002
Jean Laurent	Crédit Agricole	2002-2004
Bert Heemskerk	Rabobank	2004-2008
Wolfgang Kirsch	DZ BANK	2009-2011
Herbert Stepic	Raiffeisen Bank International	2012
Wolfgang Kirsch	DZ BANK	2013-2017

Secretaries General of the Unico Banking Group:

Name	Bank	Period
Van den Adel	Rabobank	1977-1981
Anthony Tuk	Rabobank	1980-1995
Pierre Torquebiau	Crédit Agricole	1995-1997
Remy Lasne	Crédit Agricole	1998-2012
Geert van der Horst	Rabobank	2012-2017

== Structure ==
The Unico Banking Group consisted of a 12-member Board, an Executive Committee and a standing secretariat located in Brussels.

The standing secretariat coordinated on banking issues. A specific project structure is dedicated to UniCash, the International Cash Management Service, developed by Unico members in co-operation with external parties.

== See also ==
- List of European cooperative banks
