= AEK Bank 1826 =

- Industry: Bank
- Founded: 1826
- Headquarters: Hofstettenstrasse 2, CH-3602 Thun, Switzerland
- Website: www.aekbank.ch

AEK Bank 1826 (until 2006 Amtsersparniskasse Thun) is a Swiss regional bank providing services for the Thun region. It was founded in 1826 and is organized as a cooperative. The business area is the canton of Bern. The head office is located close to the Lake Thun.

== See also ==
- List of European cooperative banks
