= Banca Centropadana =

- Native name: Banca Centropadana Credito Cooperativo S.C.
- Formerly: Cassa Rurale ed Artigiana del Basso Lodigiano
- Company type: Società Cooperativa
- Industry: Financial services
- Founded: 1971; 55 years ago
- Headquarters: 11, Piazza IV Novembre, Guardamiglio, Italy
- Number of locations: 55 branches, 1 headquarter (2015)
- Services: Retail banking
- Net income: ▼€7,477,483 (2015)
- Total assets: ▼€2,555,224,263 (2015)
- Total equity: ▼€250,694,534 (2015)
- Owner: 18,433 individuals (2015)
- Capital ratio: 14.32% (CET1)
- Website: www.centropadana.bcc.it (in Italian)
- Footnotes / references source

Banca Centropadana Credito Cooperativo, Società Cooperativa is an Italian cooperative bank based in Guardamiglio, Lombardy. The bank was a member of Federazione Italiana delle Banche di Credito Cooperativo - Casse Rurali ed Artigiane (Federcasse) and Federazione Lombarda delle Banche di Credito Cooperativo (Lombard Co-operative Banks Federation, holding 2.09%).

== History ==
The bank was founded in 1971 in Guardamiglio as a merger of three rural credit unions.

In 2014 Banca Centropadana acquired some branches of Banca Farnese from Cassa di Risparmio di Ferrara.

In 2016, due to banking reform of BCC banks (Law N°49/2016), the bank joined a banking group. The reform allowed banks with more than €200 million shareholders' equity to join a banking group or demutualize, forming a società per azioni. Banca Centropadana chose to remain as a co-operative bank.

== Sponsorship ==
- Italian football club Piacenza Calcio 1919
