= Credito Cooperativo Ravennate, Forlivese e Imolese =

- Formerly: Credito Cooperativo Ravennate e Imolese
- Company type: cooperative
- Industry: Financial services
- Predecessor: Credito Cooperativo Faenza; B.C.C. Lugo; C.C.–C.R.A. Ravenna e Russi; Banca di Forlì
- Founded: July 1955 (Credito Cooperativo Faenza); 1998 (C.C. Provincia di Ravenna)
- Headquarters: 14 Piazza della Libertà, Faenza, Italy
- Area served: Metropolitan City of Bologna, Emilia-Romagna; Province of Ravenna, Emilia-Romagna; Province of Forlì-Cesena, Emilia-Romagna
- Key people: Secondo Ricci (chairman); Gianluca Ceroni (general manager)
- Services: Retail banking
- Net income: ▲€9,093,062 (2017)
- Total assets: ▲€4,228,528,918 (2017)
- Total equity: ▲€342,373,425 (2017)
- Owner: ▲27,922 individuals (2017)
- Number of employees: 594 (2018)
- Capital ratio: 14.40% (CET1)
- Website: www.labcc.it
- Footnotes / references source

Credito Cooperativo Ravennate, Forlivese e Imolese Società Cooperativa also known as La BCC Ravennate, Forlivese e Imolese is an Italian cooperative bank based in Faenza, Romagna region. The bank served towns around Faenza, Forlì, Lugo, Imola and Ravenna.

The bank is a member of Federazione Italiana delle Banche di Credito Cooperativo - Casse Rurali ed Artigiane (Federcasse) and Federazione delle Banche di Credito Cooperativo dell'Emilia-Romagna (16.0626%). The bank own a minority interests in ICCREA Holding (2.0019%).

== History ==
Cassa Rurale ed Artigiana di Faenza was found in July 1955, as a rural credit union. The bank absorbed the local banks in Granarolo Faentino in 1969, Tredozio in 1971 and Cotignola in 1972. In 1995 the bank was renamed into Credito Cooperativo Faenza.

In 1998 the bank merged with the cooperative bank of Lugo and Ravenna–Russi to form Credito Cooperativo Provincia di Ravenna. In 2002 the bank was renamed into Credito Cooperativo Ravennate e Imolese.

In October 2016 the boards of directors of Credito Cooperativo Ravennate e Imolese and Banca di Forlì Credito Cooperativo approved the merger of the two banks, which was approved by the Bank of Italy on 21 March 2017. On 24 March the registration of the new entity was completed.

== See also ==
- Banca del Monte e Cassa di Risparmio Faenza
- Cassa di Risparmio e Banca del Monte Lugo
- Cassa di Risparmio di Ravenna
- Cassa di Risparmio di Imola
- Cassa di Risparmio in Bologna
- Cassa di Risparmio di Cesena
