= List of banks in the euro area =

The following is a list of banks in the euro area. The euro area is a single jurisdiction in terms of many (though not all) aspects of banking sector policy, including an integrated system of European banking supervision as well as a semi-integrated system of crisis response, known as the Single Resolution Mechanism (SRM). Since 1 January 2026, with the adoption by Bulgaria of the euro as its currency, the geographical scope of the euro area has been identical to that of the European banking union policy framework.

The euro area is the world's second-largest banking jurisdiction measured by total banking assets, behind China and ahead of the United States.

== Policy framework ==
European banking supervision distinguishes between significant institutions (SIs) and less significant institutions (LSIs), with SI/LSI designations updated several times every year by the European Central Bank (ECB). Significant institutions are directly supervised by the ECB using joint supervisory teams that involve the National Competent Authorities (NCAs) of individual participating countries. Less significant institutions are supervised by the relevant NCA on a day-to-day basis, under the supervisory oversight of the ECB.

Branches are supervised in differentiated ways depending on where the parent bank is located. Branches of euro-area banks are supervised together with the parent, whether the latter is an SI or LSI. Branches of banks based in the European Economic Area (EEA) but outside the euro area are supervised by the host supervisor within the euro area, generally at the national level as LSIs with the exception (as of 1 September 2025) of the Finnish branch of Danske Bank, which is designated as SI. Branches of banks based outside the EEA are supervised by the relevant NCA outside of the framework of European banking supervision, albeit under the EEA-wide framework coordinated by the European Banking Authority.

Under the SRM framework, the Single Resolution Board is the resolution authority under the EU Bank Recovery and Resolution Directive (BRRD) for all SI, plus any LSIs specifically designated by the SRB as falling under its remit. For all other LSIs, the National Resolution Authority (NRA), which in most but not all countries is the supervisory NCA, is responsible for any resolution under BRRD. Deposit Guarantee Schemes are established only at the national level.

Anti–money laundering supervision is carried out by national authorities. The Anti-Money Laundering Authority of the EU is scheduled to take over AML supervision of the largest banking groups in 2028, including in EU countries outside the euro area.

A specific feature of the EU framework is that it provides for the possibility of institutional protection scheme that bind together networks of local banks into idiosyncratic risk-sharing arrangements. There were six such schemes in the euro area as of 2022: Sparkassengruppe and Raiffeisen Banking Group in Austria, Sparkassen-Finanzgruppe and Cooperative Financial Group in Germany, South Tyrolean Raiffeisen Group in Italy, and Grupo Caja Rural in Spain. The last two IPSs are entirely constituted of LSIs, whereas the four IPSs in Austria and Germany all include SIs. For the latter, the ECB is involved in the oversight of the IPS together with the relevant NCA.

== Significant Institutions ==
As of 1 September 2025, the list of supervised institutions maintained by the ECB included the following banking groups as SIs, with names and countries as indicated by the ECB for each group's consolidating entity. Global systemically important banks (G-SIBs, as designated on 27 November 2025 by the Financial Stability Board), are shown first, then the other SIs are tiered by size bands based on the ECB's list. In each subsection, banks are listed by alphabetical order of name. Of the 113 institutions on the ECB's list, 15 are members of the four Austrian and German institutional protection schemes, marked with an asterisk (*) below.

=== Global systemically important banks ===
- (France) BPCE SA
- (France) BNP Paribas SA
- (France) Crédit Agricole SA
- (Germany) Deutsche Bank AG
- (Netherlands) ING Groep NV
- (Spain) Banco Santander SA
- (France) Société Générale SA

=== Assets in €500-999 billion range ===
- (Netherlands) ABN AMRO Bank NV
- (Spain) Banco Bilbao Vizcaya Argentaria SA
- (Spain) CaixaBank SA
- (Germany) Commerzbank AG
- (France) Confédération Nationale du Crédit Mutuel
- (Germany) DZ BANK AG Deutsche Zentral-Genossenschaftsbank*
- (Italy) Intesa Sanpaolo SpA
- (Finland) Nordea Bank Abp
- (Netherlands) Coöperatieve Rabobank UA
- (Italy) UniCredit SpA

=== Assets in €100-499 billion range ===
- (Republic of Ireland) AIB Group plc
- (Italy) Banco BPM SpA
- (France) BofA Securities Europe SA (Bank of America Group)
- (Republic of Ireland) Bank of Ireland Group plc
- (Spain) Bankinter, SA
- (Republic of Ireland) Barclays Bank Ireland plc (Barclays Group)
- (Germany) Bayerische Landesbank*
- (Belgium) Belfius Banque SA / Belfius Bank NV / Belfius Bank SA
- (Netherlands) BNG Bank NV
- (Italy) BPER Banca SpA
- (France) Bpifrance
- (Republic of Ireland) Citibank Europe plc (Citigroup)
- (Austria) Erste Group Bank AG*
- (Greece) Eurobank Ergasias Services and Holdings SA
- (Germany) Goldman Sachs Bank Europe SE (Goldman Sachs Group)
- (France) HSBC Continental Europe
- (Italy) ICCREA Banca SpA
- (Belgium) KBC Group NV
- (Germany) J.P. Morgan SE (JPMorgan Chase Group)
- (France) La Banque Postale
- (Germany) Landesbank Baden-Württemberg*
- (Germany) Landesbank Hessen-Thüringen Girozentrale*
- (Italy) Banca Monte dei Paschi di Siena SpA
- (Germany) Morgan Stanley Europe Holding SE (MS Group)
- (Germany) Norddeutsche Landesbank Girozentrale*
- (Finland) OP Osuuskunta
- (Austria) Raiffeisen Bank International AG*
- (Spain) Banco de Sabadell SA

=== Assets in €30-99 billion range ===
- (Spain) Abanca Corporación Bancaria SA
- (Belgium) Investeringsmaatschappij Argenta NV / Société d'investissements Argenta SA / Investierungsgesellschaft Argenta AG
- (Germany) Atlantic Lux HoldCo Sàrl
- (Greece) Alpha Bank SA
- (Netherlands) ASN Bank NV
- (Portugal) Banco Comercial Português SA
- (Spain) Banco de Crédito Social Cooperativo SA
- (Republic of Ireland) BofA Europe DAC (Bank of America Group)
- (Belgium) The Bank of New York Mellon SA/NV (BNY Group)
- Banque et Caisse d'Epargne de l'Etat, Luxembourg
- Banque Internationale à Luxembourg SA
- (Austria) BAWAG Group AG
- (Portugal) Caixa Geral de Depósitos SA
- (Italy) Cassa Centrale Banca - Credito Cooperativo Italiano SpA
- (Germany) Citigroup Global Markets Europe AG (Citigroup)
- (Italy) Credito Emiliano Holding SpA
- (Belgium) Crelan SA / Crelan NV
- Danske Bank A/S, Finland Branch
- (Germany) DekaBank Deutsche Girozentrale*
- (Germany) Deutsche Apotheker- und Ärztebank eG*
- (Germany) Deutsche Pfandbriefbank AG
- (Italy) FinecoBank SpA
- (Germany) Hamburg Commercial Bank AG
- (Germany) Haspa Finanzholding*
- (Spain) Ibercaja Banco SA
- (Germany) KfW Beteiligungsholding GmbH (KfW Group)
- (Finland) Kuntarahoitus Oyj
- (Spain) Kutxabank SA
- (Germany) Erwerbsgesellschaft der S-Finanzgruppe mbH & Co. KG*
- (Germany) LBS Landesbausparkasse Süd*
- (Portugal) LSF Nani Investments Sàrl (Novo Banco)
- (Italy) Mediobanca - Banca di Credito Finanziario SpA
- (Italy) Banca Mediolanum SpA
- (Germany) Münchener Hypothekenbank eG*
- National Bank of Greece SA
- (Netherlands) Nederlandse Waterschapsbank NV
- (Germany) Oldenburgische Landesbank AG
- (Greece) Piraeus Financial Holdings SA
- (France) Promontoria 19 Coöperatie UA (CCF)
- (Austria) Raiffeisen-Holding Niederösterreich-Wien regGenmbH*
- (Austria) Raiffeisenbankengruppe OÖ Verbund eGen*
- (France) RCI Banque SA
- (France) SFIL SA
- State Street Europe Holdings Germany Sàrl & Co. KG (State Street Group)
- (Latvia) Swedbank Baltics AS (Swedbank Group)
- (Germany) UBS Europe SE (UBS Group)
- (Spain) Unicaja Banco SA
- (Austria) Volksbank Wien AG
- (Germany) Volkswagen Financial Services AG
- (Germany) Wüstenrot Bausparkasse AG

=== Other significant institutions ===
- (Austria) Addiko Bank AG
- (Slovenia) AikGroup (CY) Ltd
- (Lithuania) AB Artea bankas
- Bank of Cyprus Holdings plc
- (Malta) Bank of Valletta plc
- (Latvia) AS "Citadele banka"
- (Bulgaria) DSK Bank AD
- (Estonia) AS LHV Group
- (Estonia) Luminor Holding AS
- (Malta) MDB Group Ltd
- (Germany) NatWest Bank Europe GmbH (NatWest Group)
- (Slovenia) Nova Ljubljanska banka dd
- (Slovenia) OTP Luxembourg Sàrl (OTP Group)
- (Netherlands) RBS Holdings NV (NatWest Group)
- (Lithuania) Revolut Holdings Europe UAB (Revolut Group)
- (Lithuania) AB SEB bankas
- (Latvia) AS "SEB banka"
- (Estonia) AS SEB Pank

== Less significant institutions ==
Two thirds of LSIs in the euro area were bound in an institutional protection scheme as of end-2020.

A handful of LSIs are designated by the SRB as under its remit for resolution purposes. As of 8 July 2024, these were Delen Private Bank (consolidated in Belgium), ODDO BHF (France), Bausparkasse Wüstenrot AG (Austria), and the EU subsidiary of SMBC Group (Germany).

Some banks linked to financial market infrastructures meet the criteria for being SIs but are nevertheless designated as LSIs by the ECB by special derogation. As of 1 September 2025, there were five such cases: Euroclear Holding SA/NV, Euroclear SA/NV, and Euroclear Bank, all three of which are entities of the Euroclear Group; Eurex Clearing AG, an entity of the Deutsche Börse Group; and Banque Centrale de Compensation (also known as LCH SA), an entity of the London Stock Exchange Group.

Also as of 1 September 2025, 98 out of a total 2,062 LSIs were designated by the ECB as "high-impact" on the basis of several criteria including size. They are listed below with names and countries as indicated by the ECB for each entity, by alphabetical order of name. Of these 98, 26 are members of institutional protection schemes, marked with an asterisk (*) in the list.

- (Netherlands) Achmea Bank NV
- (Greece) Aegean Baltic Bank SA
- (Finland) Aktia Bank Abp
- (Cyprus) Ancoria Investments Plc
- (Malta) APS Bank plc
- (Cyprus) Astrobank Ltd (later Alpha Bank Group)
- (France) Axa Banque
- (Italy) Banca Generali SpA
- (Spain) Banca March SA
- (Portugal) Banco CTT SA
- (Luxembourg) Bank of China (Europe) SA (Bank of China Group)
- (France) Banque Centrale de Compensation
- (Luxembourg) Banque Raiffeisen
- (Germany) BBBank eG*
- (Germany) Berliner Volksbank eG*
- (Estonia) Bigbank AS
- (Latvia) BluOr Bank AS
- (Germany) BMW Bank GmbH
- (Italy) Brianza Unione di Luigi Gavazzi e Stefano Lado SAPA
- (Bulgaria) Bulgarian Development Bank
- (Portugal) Caixa Central de Crédito Agrícola Mútuo CRL
- (Portugal) Caixa Económica Montepio Geral SA
- (Spain) Caja Laboral Popular Coop. De Credito
- (Spain) Caja Rural de Navarra SCC*
- (Italy) Cassa Centrale Raiffeisen dell'Alto Adige SpA*
- (Italy) Cassa di Risparmio di Bolzano SpA
- (Spain) Cecabank SA
- (Germany) Clearstream Holding AG
- (Estonia) Coop Pank AS
- (Greece) CrediaBank SA
- (France) CRH Caisse de Refinancement de l'Habitat
- (Slovenia) Delavska Hranilnica dd Ljubljana
- (Germany) Eurex Clearing AG
- (Belgium) Euroclear Holding SA/NV
- (Belgium) FinAx NV (Delen Private Bank)
- (Germany) Deutsche WertpapierService Bank AG
- (Malta) FIMBank plc
- (Bulgaria) First Investment Bank AD
- (Germany) Frankfurter Volksbank Rhein/Main eG*
- (Spain) Grucajrural Inversiones SLU*
- (Cyprus) Housing Finance Corporation
- (Croatia) Hrvatska poštanska banka dd
- (Austria) Hypo Noe Landesbank für Niederösterreich und Wien AG
- (Austria) Hypo Vorarlberg Bank AG
- (Germany) IKB Deutsche Industriebank AG
- (Estonia) AS Inbank
- (Bulgaria) Invest Capital AD
- (Germany) Kreissparkasse Köln*
- (Germany) Landesbank Saar*
- (Germany) LBS Landesbausparkasse NordWest*
- (Lithuania) Lietuvos centrinė kredito unija
- (Germany) Lloyds Bank GmbH (Lloyds Bank Group)
- Lombard Bank Malta plc
- (Republic of Ireland) Macquarie Bank Europe DAC (Macquarie Group)
- (Italy) Maurizio Sella SAPA
- (Italy) MedioCredito Centrale – Banca del Mezzogiorno SpA
- (Germany) Mercedes-Benz Bank AG
- (Germany) Mittelbrandenburgische Sparkasse in Potsdam*
- (Germany) Nassauische Sparkasse*
- (Netherlands) Nationale-Nederlanden Bank NV (NN Group)
- (Netherlands) NIBC Bank NV
- (Austria) Oberbank AG
- (France) Financiere IDAT (ODDO BHF)
- (Greece) Optima bank SA
- (Croatia) OTP banka dd (OTP Group)
- (Luxembourg) PayPal 2 Sàrl (PayPal Group)
- (Republic of Ireland) permanent tsb Group Holdings plc
- (Germany) Bank Pictet & Cie (Europe) AG (Pictet Group)
- (Slovakia) Prima banka Slovensko as
- (Germany) ProCredit Holding AG & Co. KGaA
- (Slovakia) Prvá stavebná sporiteľňa as
- (Austria) Raiffeisenlandesbank Burgenland eGen*
- (Austria) Raiffeisenlandesbank Kärnten regGenmbH*
- (Austria) Raiffeisen-Landesbank Tirol AG*
- (Austria) Raiffeisenlandesbank Vorarlberg regGenmbH*
- (Austria) Raiffeisenverband Salzburg eGen*
- (Austria) RLB-Stmk Verbund eGen*
- (Latvia) AS "Rietumu Banka"
- (France) Rothschild & Co
- (Finland) Säästöpankkiliitto osk
- (Germany) Sachsen-Finanzgruppe*
- (Latvia) Signet Bank AS
- (Germany) SMBC Bank EU AG (SMBC Group)
- (Finland) S-Pankki Oy
- (Germany) Sparda-Bank Baden-Württemberg eG*
- (Germany) Finanzholding der Sparkasse in Bremen*
- (Germany) Sparkasse Hannover*
- (Germany) Sparkasse KölnBonn*
- (Germany) Sparkasse Pforzheim Calw*
- (Germany) Stadtsparkasse Düsseldorf*
- (Germany) Stadtsparkasse München*
- (Germany) Toyota Kreditbank GmbH (Toyota Group)
- (Netherlands) Triodos Bank NV
- (Netherlands) Van Lanschot Kempen NV
- (Belgium) vdk bank
- (Republic of Ireland) Wells Fargo Bank IUC (Wells Fargo Group)
- (Austria) Wüstenrot Wohnungswirtschaft regGenmbH
- (Slovakia) 365.bank as

== Lists by country ==
The following articles complement this list by providing details on the local presence of SIs, non-high-impact LSIs, and defunct banks in individual euro-area countries.

- List of banks in Austria
- List of banks in Belgium
- List of banks in Bulgaria
- List of banks in Croatia
- List of banks in Cyprus
- List of banks in Estonia
- List of banks in Finland
- List of banks in France
- List of banks in Germany
- List of banks in Greece
- List of banks in the Republic of Ireland
- List of banks in Italy
- List of banks in Latvia
- List of banks in Lithuania
- List of banks in Luxembourg
- List of banks in Malta
- List of banks in the Netherlands
- List of banks in Portugal
- List of banks in Slovakia
- List of banks in Slovenia
- List of banks in Spain

== Rankings of euro-area banks by assets ==
This list of the 30 largest banks of the Eurozone is based on the April 2026 S&P Global Market Intelligence report of the 100 largest banks in the world, updated with data reported by the banks in their financial results.

Rank	Bank name	Total assets (US$ billion)	Headquarters city
1	(France) BNP Paribas	3,279.30	Paris
2	(France) Crédit Agricole	3,148.91	Paris
3	(Spain) Banco Santander	2,251.97	Santander (legal); Madrid (operations)
4	(France) Groupe BPCE	1,986.83	Paris
5	(France) Société Générale	1,813.02	Paris
6	(Germany) Deutsche Bank	1,684.94	Frankfurt
7	(France) Crédit Mutuel	1,441.94	Paris
8	(Netherlands) ING Group	1,238.00	Amsterdam
9	(Italy) Intesa Sanpaolo	1,127.02	Turin
10	(Italy) UniCredit	1,021.77	Milan
11	(Spain) Banco Bilbao Vizcaya Argentaria	1,005.77	Bilbao (legal); Madrid (operations)
12	(France) La Banque Postale	851.81	Paris
13	(Spain) CaixaBank	779.66	Barcelona
14	(Germany) DZ Bank	776.59	Frankfurt
15	(Finland) Nordea Bank	768.29	Helsinki
16	(Netherlands) Rabobank	750.13	Utrecht
17	(Germany) Commerzbank	692.84	Frankfurt
18	(Austria) Erste Group	518.50	Vienna
19	(Netherlands) ABN AMRO	510.65	Amsterdam
20	(Belgium) KBC Group	471.89	Brussels
21	(Germany) Landesbank Baden-Württemberg	407.77	Stuttgart
22	(Germany) Bayerische Landesbank	325.11	Munich
22	(Italy) Banca Monte dei Paschi di Siena	283.72	Siena
23	(Austria) Raiffeisen Bank International	257.89	Vienna
24	(Italy) Banco BPM	241.75	Milan
25	(Italy) BPER Banca	240.28	Modena
26	(Spain) Banco Sabadell	227.17	Sabadell
27	(Belgium) Belfius	226.44	Saint-Josse-ten-Noode
28	(Finland) OP Financial Group	193.54	Helsinki
29	(Republic of Ireland) Bank of Ireland	193.49	Dublin
30	(Republic of Ireland) Allied Irish Banks	173.95	Dublin

== See also ==
- List of banks in Europe
- List of banks in Andorra
- List of banks in Monaco
- List of banks in San Marino
- List of banks in Vatican City
- List of banks in Kosovo
- List of banks in Montenegro
