= ChiantiBanca =

Italian bank

- Native name: ChiantiBanca Credito Cooperativo S.C.
- Formerly: Banca del Chianti Fiorentino e Monteriggioni
- Type: Società Cooperativa
- Industry: Financial services
- Founded: 2010; 16 years ago
- Headquarters: Monteriggioni, Italy (legal); San Casciano in Val di Pesa, Italy (general office)
- Number of locations: (2015)
- Services: Retail banking
- Net income: ▼€7,060,051 (2015)
- Total assets: ▲€2,679,945,109 (2015)
- Total equity: ▲€231,931,664 (2015)
- Website: www.chiantibanca.it

ChiantiBanca (full name Credito Cooperativo, Società Cooperativa) is an Italian bank based in Monteriggioni, Tuscany.

The bank was a cooperative bank. However, in 2016 the bank demutualized. In the same year the bank also absorbed Banca di Pistoia Credito Cooperativo and Banca Area Pratese Credito Cooperativo.

== History ==
Banca del Chianti Fiorentino e Monteriggioni was formed in 2010 by the merger of Banca del Chianti Fiorentino (founded in 1909) and Banca Monteriggioni (founded in 1924). In 2012 the bank absorbed Credito Cooperativo Fiorentino (founded in 1909).

In 2016 the bank demutualized. In the same year the bank also absorbed Banca di Pistoia Credito Cooperativo and Banca Area Pratese Credito Cooperativo.

== Sponsorship ==
Banca Area Pratese was a sponsor of the football club A.C. Prato. In 2016 ChiantiBanca sponsored Prato directly as their shirt sponsor. ChiantiBanca also sponsored of S.S. Robur Siena.
