= Bipop Carire =

Italian banking group

Bipop Carire S.p.A.
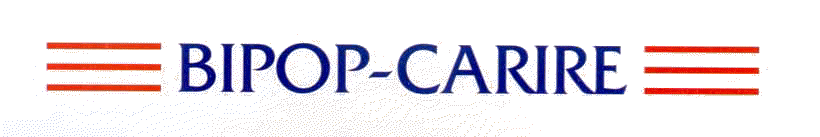
- Type: Subsidiary of a listed company
- Industry: Financial services
- Predecessor: Banca Popolare di Brescia; Cassa di Risparmio di Reggio Emilia
- Founded: 1999
- Defunct: 2008
- Fate: absorbed by UniCredit
- Successor: various divisions of UniCredit
- Headquarters: 26 via Sorbanella, Brescia, Italy
- Number of locations: ▼322 branches (2007)
- Key people: Francesco Spinelli (chairman); Rodolfo Ortolani (CEO)
- Services: Retail and corporate banking
- Net income: ▼ (€44,708,006) (2007)
- Total assets: ▲€13,346,383,467 (2007)
- Total equity: ▼€884,474,431 (2007)
- Owner: Capitalia (100% until mid-2007); UniCredit (2007–08)
- Number of employees: ▲2,815 (2007 average)
- Parent: Capitalia (until mid-2007); UniCredit (2007–08)
- Subsidiaries: Fineco
- Capital ratio: ▼7.696% (Tier 1)
- Website: www.bipop.it
- Footnotes; 2007 data

Bipop Carire S.p.A. was an Italian banking group based in Brescia, Lombardy. The group became part of the Capitalia group in 2002. Capitalia, it turn, went on to become part of UniCredit in 2007, which the brand Bipop Carire was absorbed into UniCredit in 2008. Bipop Carire was formed as a merger of Banca Popolare di Brescia (Bipop) and Cassa di Risparmio di Reggio Emilia (Carire) in 1999.

Fineco was a subsidiary of the group.

== History ==
Bipop–Carire was a merger of Cassa di Risparmio di Reggio Emilia (Carire, found 1494) and Banca Popolare di Brescia (Bipop, found 1983 by the merger of Banca Popolare di Lumezzane and Banca Popolare di Palazzolo) in 1999. It was listed in Borsa Italiana (Milan Stock Exchange). However the group suffered from a false account scandal in 2001, which the group was then merged with Banca di Roma to form Capitalia in 2002. After the merger, Bipop Carire still operated as a brand and division of Capitalia.

However, in 2008 Capitalia was acquired by UniCredit and the banking group ceased to use the brand Bipop-Carire. 4 former Bipop-Carire branches were sold to fellow Italian bank Banca Carige. The rest of the retail branches were received by the sister companies UniCredit Banca (Northern Italy) and Banca di Roma (Central-South Italy).

== Sponsorship ==
The group was a sponsor of Pallacanestro Reggiana.

== See also ==
- List of banks in Italy
