= Anyonya Co-operative Bank =

Defunct Indian Co-operative

Anyonya Co-operative Bank Limited
- Industry: Banking
- Founded: 1889 in Vadodara (formerly Baroda), India
- Defunct: 13 November 2013
- Fate: Liquidated after financial mismanagement
- Headquarters: Vadodara, India
- Products: retail banking, cooperative banking
- Owner: Banks members

Anyonya Co-operative Bank Limited (ACBL) was an Indian cooperative bank located in the city of Vadodara (formerly Baroda) in Gujarat. It was the first co-operative bank established in India and was liquidated in 2013.

After the discovery of after financial mismanagement and the inability for the bank to recover loans, the Reserve Bank of India ordered the bank to stop most of its operations under Section 35 of the Banking Regulation Act, on 14 September 2007.

At the banks annual general meeting in September 2008 a committee was formed to attempt re-open the bank. Several attempts were made to rescue the bank and sell it to other cooperative banks, but these all failed. By 2010 a decision was made to put the bank into liquidated and it finally closed in 2013.

== History ==
ACBL was established in 1889 under the name Anyonya Sahayakari Mandali Co-operative Bank Limited, with a primary objective of providing an alternative to exploitation by moneylenders for Baroda's residents. It was the first cooperative bank to be established in India.

When it was started in 1889 it had just 23 members and 76 Indian rupees (Rs) of capital, which grew to Rs 873 in the first year. By 2006, it had grown to more than 23,000 share holders and more than ten branches which are mainly located within Baroda city and some small towns surrounding it.

Its administration was governed by a group of nine board directors, three of whom are elected every year for a three-year term.

In 2007 the bank started to have financial issues due to financial mismanagement and the inability to recover loans. As a result, the reserve bank of India stopped the bank operating.

Several attempts were made to merge it with other cooperative banks, but these all failed. In 2010 the bank was liquidated and in 2013 the liquidators sold off the remaining assets. In 2020, several people were arrested for a fraud involving Rs 1.7 crore of assets of Anoyonya bank that has been deposited by the liquidators.

== See also ==
- Co-operative banking
- Banking in India
