= BCC Iccrea Group =

Italian cooperative banking group

ICCREA Banca
- Native name: ICCREA Banca
- Formerly: Istituto Centrale delle Casse Rurali ed Artigiane
- Company type: S.p.a. owned by cooperative banks
- Industry: Financial services
- Founded: 1963
- Headquarters: Rome, Italy
- Area served: Italy
- Services: co-operative bank
- Net income: €2 billion (2024)
- Total assets: €165,725 billion (Q2 2025)
- Total equity: €15,9 billion (2024)
Subsidiaries
ICCREA BancaImpresa	(99.33%)
BCC Assicurazioni	(JV, 49%)
BCC Vita	(JV, 49.06%)
- Capital ratio: ▼12.04% (Group CET1 Capital ratio, Dec.2016)
- Footnotes / references in consolidated financial statement

The BCC Iccrea Group Italian: Gruppo BCC Iccrea) is Italy's main cooperative banking group, bringing together most of the country's cooperative credit banks or Banche di Credito Cooperativo (BCC). It is centered on a national institution, Iccrea Banca, formerly known as Istituto Centrale delle Casse Rurali ed Artigiane (lit. 'central institution of the rural and artisanal cooperative banks').

As of early 2024, the group included 115 member BCCs and was Italy's fourth-largest banking group with €175 billion of consolidated assets at end-2023.

== History ==
The roots of BCC Iccrea Group go back to the pan-European spread of the cooperative banking movement in the 19th century, catalyzed by the initiatives led in Germany by Franz Hermann Schulze-Delitzsch and Friedrich Wilhelm Raiffeisen. The first Italian cooperative bank had been the Cassa Rurale a Loreggia in the province of Padua, created in 1883 at the initiative of economist and politician Leone Wollemborg. Several initiatives followed to establish representative organizations of the cooperative movement, including the Federazione fra le Casse Rurali e Sodalizi affini formed by 51 rural cooperative banks in 1888, the Lega delle cooperative in 1893, and the Federazione Italiana delle Casse Rurali Cattoliche in 1909. Following postwar turmoil, the Federazione Italiana delle Casse Rurali e Artigiane was re-established in 1950 and remains as the national umbrella organization of BCCs, generally abbreviated as Federcasse.

In 1963, Federcasse fostered the establishment of a ICCREA (then typically typeset in capital letters) as the network's central financial entity. Ten years later, competing institutions were created by the cooperative banks in South Tyrol and Trentino which had a distinctive history going back to Austrian rule before World War I, later leading to the formation of the South Tyrolean Raiffeisen Group and Gruppo Cassa Centrale Banca as separate cooperative banking groups.

The 1994 Consolidated Banking Act led Italian cooperative banks, previously known as rural and artisanal cooperative banks (casse rurali ed artigiane) to adopt a uniform identity as BCCs with a nationwide logo (except for South Tyrol where the Raiffeisen brand was long established). In 1995, ICCREA Holding was established as a parent entity owning ICCREA Banca, ICCREA BancaImpresa, and several other affiliate companies. The equity ownership of ICCREA Holding, in turn, was overwhelmingly held by the BCCs. In 2014, the largest such stake was that held by Banca di Credito Cooperativo di Roma (3.6 percent), followed by Cassa Centrale Banca - Credito Cooperativo del Nord Est in Trento (2.82 percent), Credito Cooperativo Ravennate e Imolese (2 percent), Banca di Credito Cooperativo di Pompiano e della Franciacorta (1.64 percent), Cassa Padana (1.35 percent), and Raiffeisen Landesbank Südtirol – Cassa Centrale Raiffeisen dell'Alto Adige (1.11 percent).

ICCREA has been designated as a significant institution since the entry into force of European Banking Supervision in late 2014, and as a consequence has been directly supervised by the European Central Bank (ECB) since then.

In 2016, new legislation reforming the Italian cooperative banking sector mandated all BCCs to join a banking group, leading to the emergence of the three groups based in Rome (BCC Iccrea), Trento (Cassa Centrale Banca), and Bolzano (Raiffeisen). In the subsequent reorganization of group structures, Iccrea Banca became the group's parent entity by absorbing ICCREA Holding. That phase of reorganization of the BCC Iccrea Group was completed on 4 March 2019. As a consequence, the entire group including all participating BCCs came under direct supervision by the ECB.

== Group structure ==
As of early 2024, Iccrea Banca had 134 shareholders, among which 115 were individual BCCs and 12 regional BCC associations (themselves members of Federcasse), none of which owned more than 10 percent of total equity. Iccrea Banca does not appear to disclose details of its shareholding structure in the public domain, and the corresponding page of its website appeared based on obsolete data as of mid-2025. The group's financial resilience is supported by a "cohesion agreement" that ensures group support of any failing BCC; should the group as a whole run into distress, individual deposits are protected by the Federcasse-affiliated Fondo di Garanzia dei Depositanti del Credito Cooperativo (FGD).

The group has a highly distributed territorial footprint. As of end-2024, its BCCs were present in 1,676 of Italy's 4,513 municipalities (37 percent); in 382 of these, the BCC was the only bank in the municipality. As of late 2023, the group employed 22,416 staff in its central entities and individual BCCs.

The number of BCCs in the group has steadily eroded due to gradual consolidation. It decreased from 130 in mid-2021 to 113 in mid-2025. Of these, 21 were in Lombardy, 14 in Apulia, 12 in Marche, 12 in Tuscany, 9 in Sicily, 8 in Veneto, 7 in Campania, and 30 in the remaining regions.

== See also ==
- List of European cooperative banks
- List of banks in the euro area
- List of banks in Italy
