= Fondazione Roma =

Italian banking foundation

Fondazione Roma formerly Fondazione Cassa di Risparmio di Roma is a charity organization based in Rome, Italy. The organization succeeds the historical financial institution Cassa di Risparmio di Roma (est. 1836) as it was reorganized as a banking foundation in 1991, with its banking operations spun off to merge with other Roman banks and form Banca di Roma, later a component of Capitalia then Unicredit. The foundation remained as a shareholder of UniCredit, the banking group that acquired Capitalia in mid-2007. As at 31 December 2006, the foundation was the second largest shareholder of Capitalia for 5.02% stake.

At 31 December 2007 the foundation owned 1.13% stake of UniCredit. It was diluted to 0.956% in 2009, 0.484% in 2013. (increased back to 0.478% in 2014 due to decrease in total share capital of the bank)

As at 31 December 2015, the foundation had a shareholders' equity of €1.522 billion.

== History ==
In 1991–92 the Cassa di Risparmio di Roma spun off its banking activities and inject to a società per azioni (company limited by shares) in exchange for new shares. The S.p.A. later became part of Banca di Roma S.p.A. and the legal person of the former bank was renamed from Cassa di Risparmio di Roma to Fondazione Cassa di Risparmio di Roma. The latter was renamed into Fondazione Roma in 2007.

As at 31 December 2015, the foundation still owned 0.479% stake of UniCredit, or 28,571,220 number of shares.

The foundation also owned 4.25% stake of Edizioni Scientifiche Italiane, 0.09% stake of Banca della Nuova Terra, 2.93% stake of Sator S.p.A. (founded by former Capitalia CEO Matteo Arpe), and 8% stake of Fondaco SGR as at 31 December 2015. Fondazione Roma invested in a private equity fund family Fondaco Roma Fund, which Fondaco SGR was the manager.

The foundation owned 100% distribution units of the sub-funds Fondaco Roma Global Equity Satellite I, II & II, Global Bond Satellite I & II, Global Balanced Core (the capitalisation units of the sub-fund was not owned by the foundation) and Emerging Markets Bond, which had a consolidated net asset value of €1.392 billion (€1.359 billion contributed to the foundation)

The fund family invested in Alibaba Group, Baidu, Ctrip, Tencent Holdings, Novozymes, Hermès, Kering, L'Oréal, Rocket Internet, AIA Group, Stratasys, Inditex, Atlas Copco, ARM Holdings, Burberry, Alphabet Inc., Amazon.com, Bluebird Bio, Facebook, Illumina, Intuitive Surgical, Ionis Pharmaceuticals, Lending Club, LinkedIn, Netflix, Salesforce.com, Seattle Genetics, Splunk, Tesla Motors, TripAdvisor, Twitter, Whole Foods Market, Workday, Inc. (Global Equity Satellite I) as well as UniCredit (33,525 shares), Intesa Sanpaolo, Banca Monte dei Paschi di Siena, Banco Popolare and UBI Banca, etc. (Global Balanced Core)
