= Banca d'Alba =

Italian cooperative bank

Banca di Credito Cooperativo di Alba, Langhe, Roero e Canavese
- Trade name: Banca d'Alba
- Native name: Banca di Credito Cooperativo di; Alba, Langhe, Roero e Canavese; Società cooperativa
- Company type: unlisted cooperative
- ISIN: IT0004234339 (bond 2007–2017); IT0004616246 (bond 2010–2017); IT0004633258 (bond 2010–2017)
- Industry: Financial services
- Predecessor: C.R.A. Diano d'Alba; C.R.A. Gallo di Grinzane Cavour; C.R.A. Vezza d'Alba
- Founded: 1895 (Diano d'Alba); 1899 (Vezza d'Alba); 1900 (Gallo di Grinzane Cavour); 1998 (Banca d'Alba)
- Headquarters: 4 via Cavour, Alba, Italy
- Number of locations: 70 branches (2015)
- Area served: Piedmont and Liguria regions
- Key people: Tino Ernesto Cornaglia (chairman); Enzo Cazzullo (general manager)
- Services: Retail banking
- Revenue: ▼€129.698 million (2015)
- Net income: ▼€18.340 million (2015)
- Total assets: ▼€5.044 billion (2015)
- Total equity: ▲€318.479 million (2015)
- Owner: ▲47,840 individuals (2015)
- Number of employees: ▼457 (2015)
- Subsidiaries: Immobiliare Banca d'Alba (100%)
- Capital ratio: ▲11.12% (CET1, parent company)
- Rating: Moody's
- Website: bancadalba.it
- Footnotes / references in a consolidated basis

Banca di Credito Cooperativo di Alba, Langhe, Roero e Canavese S.C. known as Banca d'Alba is an Italian cooperative bank based in Alba, Piedmont region. The bank is a member of Federazione Italiana delle Banche di Credito Cooperativo - Casse Rurali ed Artigiane (Federcasse) and Federazione delle Banche di Credito Cooperativo del Piemonte, Valle d'Aosta e Liguria. The bank owns a minority interest in ICCREA Banca.

== History ==
Banca d'Alba was founded in 1998 by the merger of Casse Rurali e Artigiana di Diano d'Alba, C.R.A. di Gallo di Grinzane Cavour and C.R.A. di Vezza d'Alba, the three rural credit unions based in the Province of Cuneo. Banca d'Alba, today, has 74 branches in 449 municipalities in Piedmont and Liguria.

== See also ==
- Cassa di Risparmio di Cuneo, a defunct bank based in Cuneo, predecessor of Banca Regionale Europea
- Banca Regionale Europea, a defunct bank based in Cuneo, now part of UBI Banca
- Cassa Rurale ed Artigiana di Boves, an Italian bank based in Boves, in the Province of Cuneo
