= Capitalia =

Former Italian bank

- Native name: Capitalia S.p.A.
- Company type: listed Società per Azioni
- Industry: Financial services
- Predecessor: Banca di Roma Group; Bipop Carire Group
- Founded: 1 July 2002
- Defunct: 2007
- Fate: absorbed by UniCredit
- Successor: UniCredit
- Headquarters: Via Marco Minghetti 17, Rome, Italy
- Key people: Cesare Geronzi (President); Paolo Savona (Vice-President); Paolo Cuccia (Vice-President); Matteo Arpe (CEO)
- Subsidiaries: Banca di Roma; Banco di Sicilia; Bipop Carire; FinecoBank; Mediocredito Centrale; IRFIS – Mediocredito della Sicilia
- Website: Official website

Capitalia was an Italian banking group headquartered in Rome, in existence between 2002 and 2008. The bank was a listed company in Borsa Italiana (Milan Stock Exchange). The bank was acquired by UniCredit by issuing new shares of UniCredit for shares of Capitalia.

== History ==
Capitalia was formed on 1 July 2002 in a merger of Banca di Roma (and its subsidiary Banco di Sicilia and Mediocredito Centrale) and Bipop Carire (and its subsidiary Fineco). In the same year the bank sold 10 branches from Apulia, Campania and Molise regions to Banca Popolare di Puglia e Basilicata.

Capitalia in turn agreed to be taken over by UniCredit in May 2007, becoming part of the second-largest bank in the European Union by stock market value and the sixth-largest in the world.

=== Merger with UniCredit ===
In May 2007, plans were finalized for the buyout of Capitalia by its larger Italian rival, UniCredit. All banks of the Capitalia group in Northern Italy will be reconfigured as UniCredit banks; in turn, all Unicredit banks in the rest of Italy will be reconfigured as either Banca di Roma banks (rest of mainland Italy and Sardinia) or as Banco di Sicilia banks (in Sicily only).

== Group members ==
As of 31 December 2006

- retail banks:
  - Banca di Roma
  - Banco di Sicilia
  - Bipop Carire
  - FinecoBank (99.99% stake)
- Commercial, investment and merchant banks:
  - Capitalia Merchant S.p.A.
  - Capitalia Partecipazioni S.p.A.
  - Capitalia Sofipa SGR S.p.A. (ex-MCC Sofipa SGR)
  - Capitalia Asset Management SGR S.p.A.
  - Capitalia Investimenti Alternativi SGR S.p.A. (95% stake, other 5% FinecoBank)
  - Capitalia Luxembourg S.A. (99.99% stake, ex-Banca di Roma International)
  - Eurofinance 2000
  - FinecoLeasing S.p.A. (99.99% stake)
  - Fineco Finance Limited
  - Fineco Mutui S.p.A. (subsidiary of FinecoBank)
  - Fineco Verwaltung
  - Fondi Immobiliari Italiani SGR (51.55% stake)
  - IRFIS – Mediocredito della Sicilia (subsidiary of Banco di Sicilia for 76.25% stake)
  - Immobiliari Piemonte (subsidiary of MCC)
  - Mediocredito Centrale
- common service companies:
  - Capitalia Informatica S.p.A.
  - Capitalia Service JV S.r.l.
  - Capitalia Solutions (51% stake)

- minority interests
  - Fineco Assicurazioni S.p.A. (49% stake)
  - CNP Capitalia Vita S.p.A. (16.92% stake by Capitalia, 21.88% stake by Fineco Verwaltung)
  - Italpetroli (49% stake via Banca di Roma)
    - Roma 2000 (via Italpetroli)
      - A.S. Roma (via Roma 2000)

== Shareholders ==
As of 31 December 2006

- shareholders with >2% stake
1. ABN AMRO Group (8.59%)
2. Fondazione Cassa di Risparmio di Roma (5.02%)
3. Fondazione Manodori (4.13%)
4. Fondiaria-Sai Group (3.51%)
5. Sicily Region (2.84%)
6. Fondazione Banco di Sicilia (2.73%)
7. Libyan Foreign Bank (2.58%)
8. Assicurazioni Generali (2.35%)
9. Tosinvest (2.10%)

== See also ==
- List of banks in Italy
