= Cassa di Risparmio di Reggio Emilia =

Defunct Italian bank

- Native name: Cassa di Risparmio di Reggio Emilia S.p.A.
- Type: private Società per Azioni
- Industry: Financial services
- Founded: 1494 (as mount of piety); 31 March 1852 (as Cassa di Risparmio); 1991 (S.p.A.)
- Founder: Pietro Manodori
- Defunct: 1999
- Fate: merged with Banca Popolare di Brescia
- Successor: Fondazione Manodori (for charity); Bipop Carire (for bank)
- Headquarters: Palazzo Pratonieri, via Toschi 9, Reggio Emilia, Italy
- Services: Retail and corporate banking
- Owner: Fondazione Manodori (51.34%); Cariparma (13.95%)
- Footnotes; 1998 data

Cassa di Risparmio di Reggio Emilia S.p.A. (Carire) was an Italian bank based in Reggio Emilia. The bank merged with Banca Popolare di Brescia in 1999.

According to Mediobanca, the bank was ranked 45th in terms of client deposits in 1998 (€1,905,209 thousands).

== History ==
The bank was found on 31 March 1852 by Pietro Manodori, the president of Reggio Emilia's mount of piety (found circa 1494). The formation of the bank was authorized by a decree of Francis V, Duke of Modena, the ruler of the Duchy of Modena and Reggio at that time.

Due to Legge Amato, the daily bank operation and ownership were split into a società per azioni and a bank foundation in 1991. At first the bank had a share capital of 120 billion lire. It was increased to 183 billion lire (about €94.5 million) in 1999.

The bank was merged with Banca Popolare di Brescia (Bipop), forming Bipop Carire in 1999 (Bipop Carire was absorbed by UniCredit in 2008). Cariparma was a minority shareholder of Carire but was sold in 1999 in favor of the mergers of both Bipop Carire as well as Cariparma to Banca Intesa.

== See also ==
- List of banks in Italy
