= POP Bank Group =

Cooperative banking group in Finland

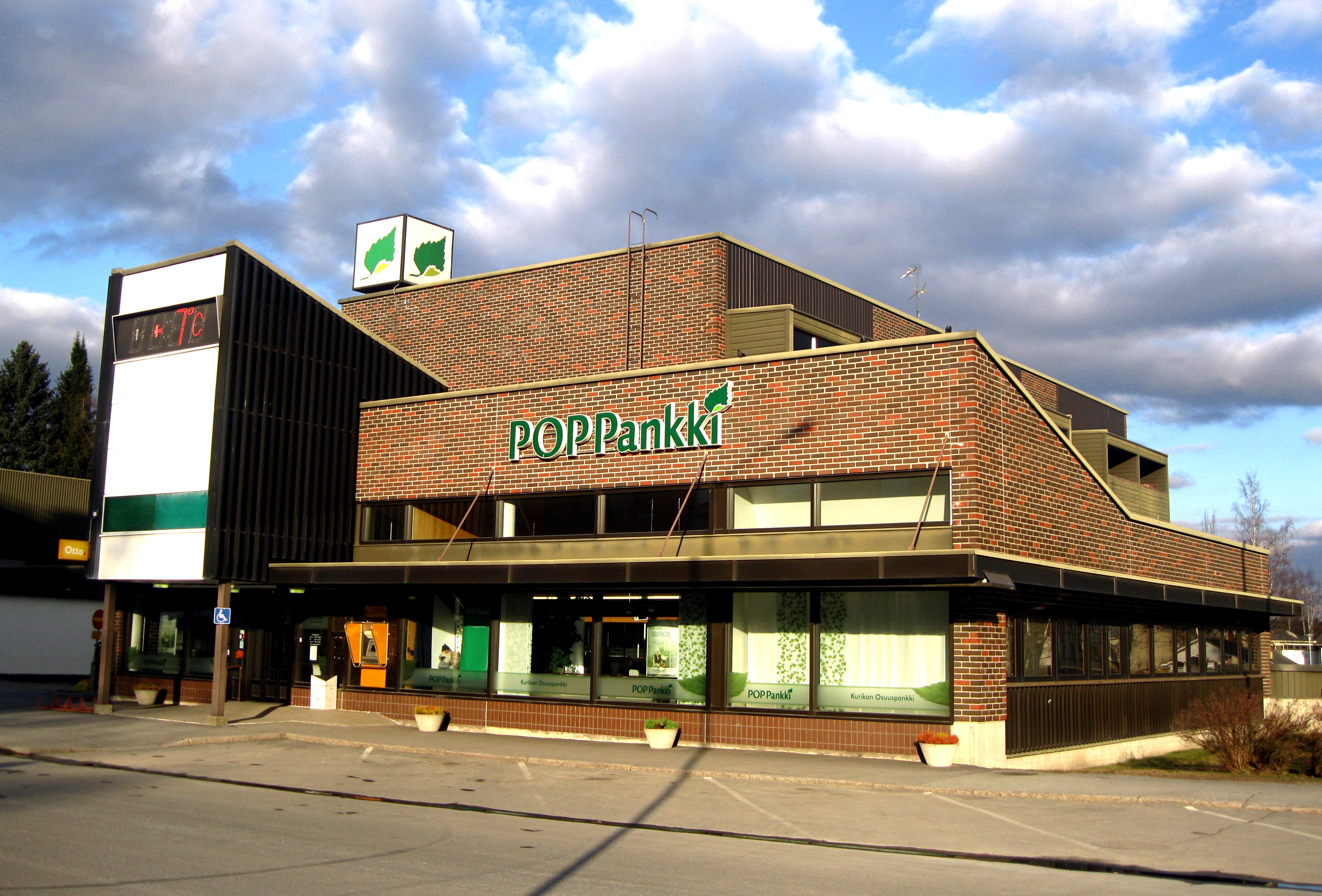
- POP Bank branch in Kurikka
- Company type: Cooperative
- Industry: Financial services
- Founded: 1997; 29 years ago
- Headquarters: Espoo, Finland
- Area served: Finland
- Products: Banking services
- Owner: Its member organizations
- Website: www.poppankki.fi

The POP Bank Group (formerly Paikallisosuuspankki, lit. 'local cooperative bank') is a cooperative banking group in Finland, with central entities in Helsinki and 18 individual cooperative banks (Finnish: osuuspankki) known as POP banks. The central entities include a central cooperative owned by the local banks, POP Bank Centre Coop (POP Pankkikeskus osk), which is responsible for the group's management and supervision and holds a banking license. POP Bank Centre Coop in turn owns Bonum Bank (Bonum Pankki), a group-wide credit institution, and POP Asuntoluottopankki, a mortgage bank.

As of end-2024, the POP Bank Group had €6.3 billion in total consolidated assets; Bonum Bank had €2 billion in assets, and POP Asuntoluottopankki had €798 million. All the group's banks are designated as "less significant institutions" under European Banking Supervision.

== History ==
The Paikallisosuuspankki Group (Paikallisosuuspankki-ryhmä) was formed in 1997 when 44 cooperative banks separated from the Finnish Cooperative Bank Group, now known as OP Financial Group. The driver of the split was dissatisfaction of some local cooperative banks with the national group's reorganization in the wake of the 1990s Finnish banking crisis, which they viewed as overcentralized and imbalanced in favor of urban cooperative banks.

In 2008 the group established a payments entity, ACH Finland Oyj. The group rebranded itself from Paikallisosuuspankki to POP Pankki (lit. 'POP Bank') in 2010. In 2012 it established an general insurance subsidiary, POP Vakuutus (lit. 'POP Insurance').

EU banking regulation led the POP banks to adopt a more centralized structure in 2015. POP Pankkiliitto (lit. 'POP Bank Association') was formed on 31 December 2015, and ACH Finland, rebranded Bonum Bank the previous year, took over central financing operations that had until then been outsourced to Aktia Bank. On that occasion, eight member banks, accounting for 22 percent of the group's aggregate capital base, left the POP group as they viewed it as exhibiting similar flaws as the OP Group had in 1997. Two of these merged into Oma Säästöpankki, whereas the other six joined the OP Group.

POP Asuntoluottopankki received its license to operate as a mortgage bank in May 2022. The group sold 70 percent of its insurance subsidiary, formally registered as Suomen Vahinkovakuutus (lit. 'Finnish non-life insurance'), to LähiTapiola in 2023. The POP Group retains 30 percent of Suomen Vahinkovakuutus via an intermediate entity, POP Holding Oy.

== Local cooperative banks ==
See also the list of POP banks, which includes former members of the group

As of 1 September 2025, the European Central Bank's list of supervised entities included 18 local cooperative banks of the POP Group:

- Honkajoen Osuuspankki
- Isojoen Osuuspankki
- Kannonkosken Osuuspankki
- Hetki Osuuspankki
- Konneveden Osuuspankki
- Kosken Osuuspankki
- Kurikan Osuuspankki
- Kyrön Seudun Osuuspankki
- Kyyjärven Osuuspankki
- Lammin Osuuspankki
- Lanneveden Osuuspankki
- Lappajärven Osuuspankki
- Lakeuden Osuuspankki
- Lavian Osuuspankki
- Nivalan Järvikylän Osuuspankki
- Pohjanmaan Osuuspankki
- Järvi-Suomen Osuuspankki
- Suupohjan (Suomen) Osuuspankki

The POP Bank Group is considered as a single bank for the purpose of deposit insurance, because the entities within the group are fully or partially liable for each other's commitments and obligations.

== See also ==
- Finnish Savings Banks Group
- S-Bank
- List of banks in Finland
- List of European cooperative banks
