= South Tyrolean Raiffeisen Group =

Italian cooperative group

Raiffeisen Landesbank Südtirol Cassa Centrale Raiffeisen dell'Alto Adige

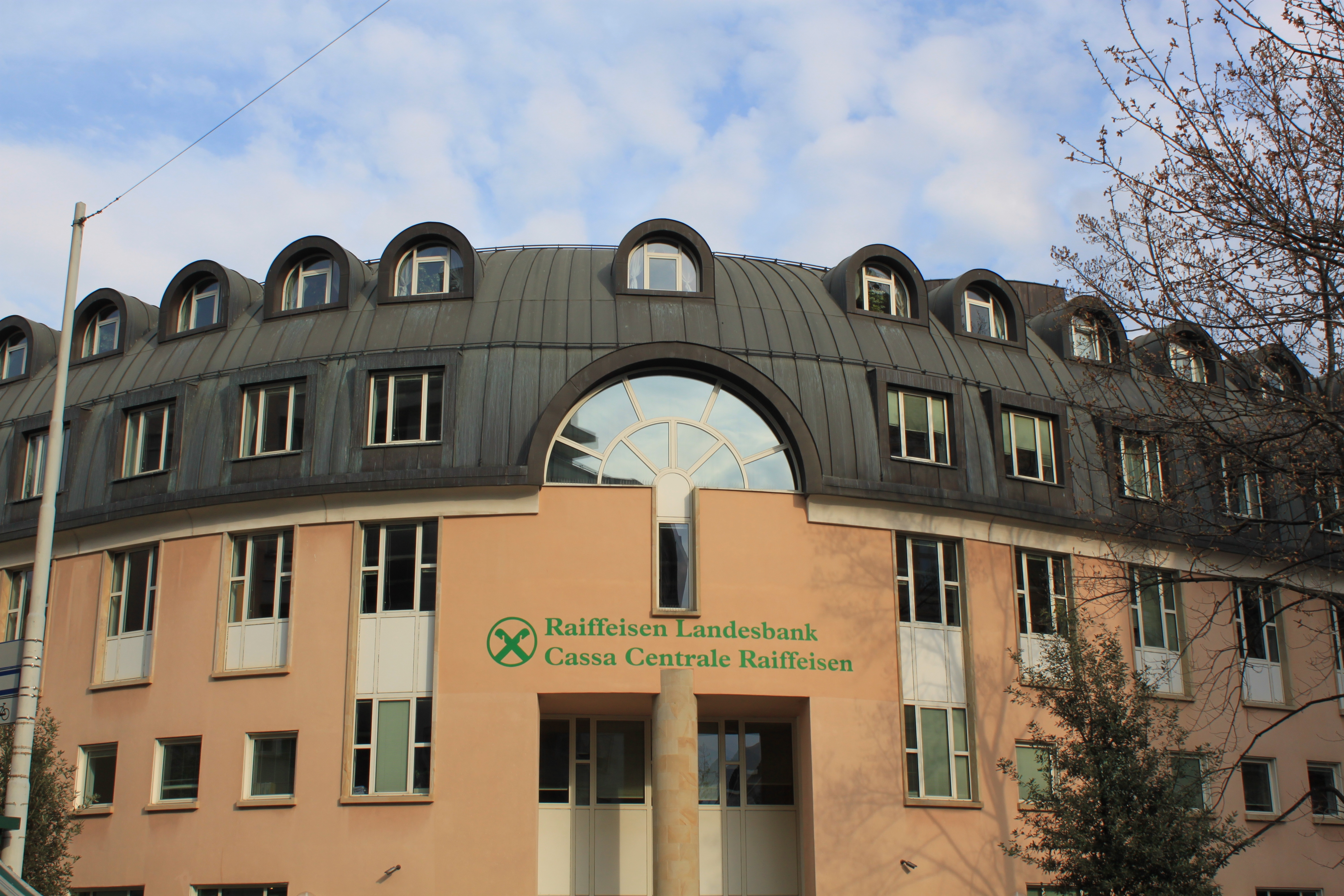
- Head office of Raiffeisen Landesbank Südtirol in Bolzano, inaugurated in 1989
- Company type: coop joint venture (in S.p.A. legal form)
- Industry: Financial services
- Founded: 1973 (oldest constituent bank 1889)
- Headquarters: Bolzano, South Tyrol, Italy
- Key people: Hanspeter Felder (President and CEO); Hubert Berger (chairman of the supervisory board); Zenone Giacomuzzi (Director General)
- Services: central institute of cooperative banks
- Net income: ▲€24,070,574 (2020)
- Total assets: ▲€5,872,770,184 (2020)
- Total equity: ▲€425,150,681 (2020)
- Subsidiaries: Casse Rurali Raiffeisen Finanziaria (JV 50%); AlpenBank (JV 49.99%)
- Capital ratio: 20.54% (Tier 1 capital ratio)
- Website: raiffeisen.it

The South Tyrolean Raiffeisen Group is a cooperative banking group in the bilingual South Tyrol autonomous province of Italy, headquartered in Bolzano.

Made principally of 39 autonomous local cooperative banks (German: Raiffeisenkassen, Italian: Casse Raiffeisen), the group is integrated via an institutional protection scheme (IPS) managed by its member entities' umbrella association, the Raiffeisenverband Südtirol – Federazione Cooperative Raiffeisen. It also relies on a central financing entity, Raiffeisen Landesbank Südtirol – Cassa Centrale Raiffeisen dell'Alto Adige.

As of end-2024, the South Tyrolean Raiffeisen IPS had aggregate assets of €18.8 billion, whereas the central Landesbank had assets of €3.7 billion.

== Overview ==
The Italian Raiffeisen group's oldest constituent bank was founded in Val Badia (Gadertal) in 1889, under Austrian law. In the 1890s, a central organization was founded in Innsbruck, serving all the local Raiffeisen banks in both North and South Tyrol. The group's organisation was disrupted when the region was absorbed by Italy in the immediate aftermath of World War I.

On 14 June 1973, Raiffeisen Landesbank Südtirol was re-established by the local Raiffeisen cooperative banks as their central financial organization.

Raiffeisen Landesbank Südtirol formed a joint venture called AlpenBank with Raiffeisen-Landesbank Tirol in Innsbruck, which in 2022 became Alpen Privatbank through a merger after which Raiffeisen Landesbank Südtirol remained a minority shareholder owning 16.5 percent of the equity. Raiffeisen Landesbank Südtirol also established a sub-holding company, Casse Rurali Raiffeisen Finanziaria, together with Cassa Centrale Banca - Credito Cooperativo del Nord Est, which owned a significant stake in Investitionsbank Trentino Südtirol – Mediocredito Trentino Alto Adige. The Raiffeisen-Landesbank Südtirol also has owned a minority stake in ICCREA Banca, the central institute of the BCC Iccrea Group.

Raiffeisen Landesbank Südtirol has been designated as a "less significant institution" since the entry into force of European Banking Supervision in late 2014, as are all the group's local Raiffeisen cooperative banks. As such, they are all directly supervised by the Bank of Italy. Following new Italian legislation on cooperative banks in 2016, the group's institutional protection scheme (IPS) was established on 14 June 2019, bringing together the 39 local cooperative banks, Raiffeisen Landesbank Südtirol, and specialized lender RK Leasing GmbH. The IPS was approved by the Bank of Italy on 3 November 2020. Based on 2019 data, it was the smallest among all 8 IPSs approved in the EU, in terms both of the number of customers (300,000) and the amount of covered deposits (€7 billion).

The Raiffeisenverband Südtirol is a member of the International Raiffeisen Union.

== See also ==
- BCC Iccrea Group
- Gruppo Cassa Centrale Banca
- List of banks in the euro area
- List of banks in Italy
- List of European cooperative banks
