= Prepaid card =

Prepaid card may refer to:

- Prepaid debit card, a card that debits money from an associated account that ordinarily requires use of a PIN code for verification
- Prepaid credit card, a card that debits money from an associated account that ordinarily uses a signature rather than a PIN for verification
- Stored-value card, a card that has a monetary value that is recorded as data on the card itself, and thus can be used without online access to an associated account
