= Gruppo Cassa Centrale Banca =

Italian cooperative banking group

Cassa Centrale Banca - Credito Cooperativo Italiano
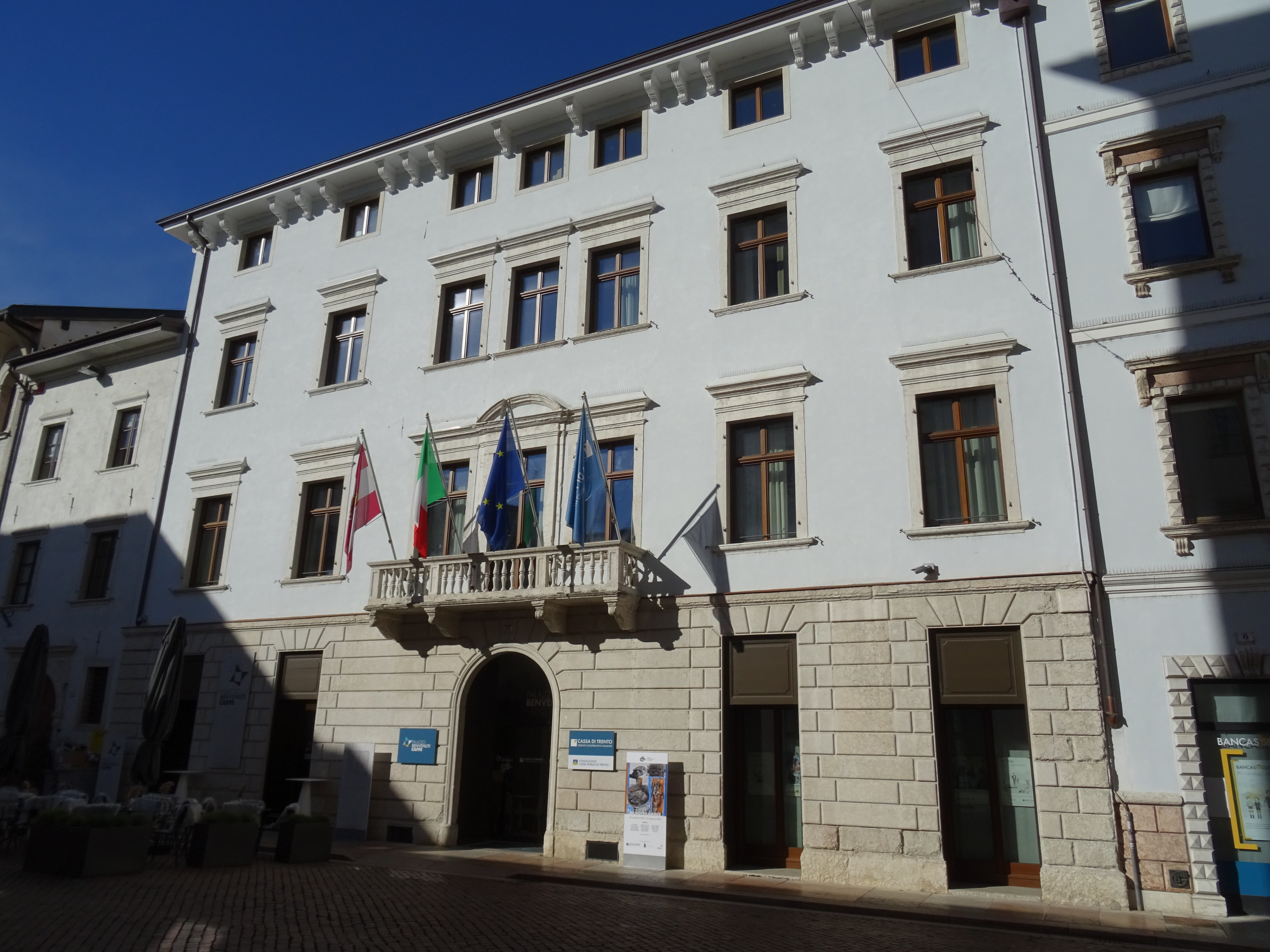
- Palazzo Benvenuti in Trento, seat of Banca per il Trentino Alto Adige – Bank für Trentino-Südtirol
- Formerly: Cassa Centrale delle Casse Rurali Trentine; Cassa Centrale delle Casse Rurali Trentine e delle Banche di Credito del Nord Est
- Type: Società per Azioni owned by coop companies
- Industry: Financial services
- Founded: 28 February 1974
- Founder: 133 local banks of Trentino
- Headquarters: Trento, Italy
- Services: central entity of Gruppo Cassa Centrale Banca
Net income
▲€19 million	(2016 Group)
▲€18 million	(2016 Company)
- Total assets: €90,711 billion (Q2 2025)
Total equity
€270 million	(2016 Group)
€240 million	(2016 Company)
Owner
co-operative banks of Trentino (via Centrale Finanziaria del Nord Est)	(68.606%)
DZ Bank	(25%)
Trentino Autonomous Province	(4.963%)
others shareholders	(1.431%)
- Parent: Centrale Finanziaria del Nord Est
Subsidiaries
Centrale Leasing Nord Est	(100%)
Centrale Credit & Real Estate Solutions	(100%)
Centrale Soluzioni Immobiliari	(100%)
Casse Rurali – Raiffeisen Finanziaria	(50%)
Nord Est Asset Management	(50%)
Capital ratio
▲23.82%	(2016 Group CET1 Capital ratio)
▲24.71%	(2016 Company CET1 Capital ratio)
- Rating: Moody's
- Website: www.cassacentrale.it
- Footnotes: Group data obtained from consolidated financial statement of Centrale Finanziaria del Nord Est (instead of Cassa Centrale Banca), INCLUDING minority interest; company data obtained from separate financial statement of Cassa Centrale Banca

Gruppo Cassa Centrale Banca is an Italian cooperative banking group based in Trento. As of 1 May 2025, it brought together 65 local credit unions (Italian: Banche di Credito Cooperativo or BCCs), the main one being the Banca per il Trentino Alto Adige – Bank für Trentino-Südtirol that was formed on 1 January 2024 by agglomeration of various local cooperative banks of the Trentino-Alto Adige/Südtirol autonomous region.

The group's central entity, Cassa Centrale Banca - Credito Cooperativo Italiano (CCB), has been designated in 2019 as a Significant Institution under the criteria of European Banking Supervision, and as a consequence is directly supervised by the European Central Bank.

== History ==
Gruppo Cassa Centrale Banca originates in the agricultural cooperative movements of the 19th century pioneered in Germany by Friedrich Wilhelm Raiffeisen. The first Raiffeisen-like cooperative on Italian soil was established in 1883 as the Cassa Rurale a Loreggia in the province of Padua, at the initiative of economist and politician Leone Wollemborg. In 1887, the Federazione delle Casse Rurali was established as a national umbrella group by 51 rural cooperative banks (Italian: casse rurali). The Italian cooperative credit movement was further stimulated in 1891 by Pope Leo XIII's publication of his landmark encyclical Rerum novarum, after which many Catholic figures and organizations were active in it. The legal entity now known as Banca per il Trentino-Alto Adige was founded in Trento on 27 January 1898.

In 1974, Cassa Centrale delle Casse Rurali Trentine was established by the BCCs of the Trentino region. It was renamed Cassa Centrale delle Casse Rurali Trentine e delle Banche di Credito Cooperativo del Nord Est in 2002, then Cassa Centrale Banca - Credito Cooperativo del Nord Est in 2007 (abbreviated as CCB) as the group gradually expanded its geographical footprint.

Also in 2007, DZ Bank acquired 25 percent equity ownership in CCB. On that occasion, Centrale Finanziaria del Nord Est was established as a new holding company owned by the participating BCCs, which previously owned CCB directly. As of late 2014, CCB was owned by Centrale Finanziaria del Nord Est (69 percent), DZ Bank (25 percent), the Autonomous Province of Trento (5 percent), and a few more individual cooperatives and residual shareholders.

In 2016, the Italian government passed legislation 49/2016 on reform of the cooperative credit sector, which encouraged the local BCCs to consolidate into larger groups without losing their cooperative ownership and identity. In 2017, Cassa Centrale Banca - Credito Cooperativo del Nord Est renamed itself as Cassa Centrale Banca - Credito Cooperativo Italiano and was designated as central entity for one of three such groups, the other two being ICCREA Banca and Raiffeisen Landesbank Südtirol – Cassa Centrale Raiffeisen dell'Alto Adige. Centrale Finanziaria del Nord Est was subsequently liquidated in late 2017.

== Joint ventures ==
Gruppo Cassa Centrale Banca used to have a joint venture with its northern counterpart Raiffeisen Landesbank Südtirol – Cassa Centrale Raiffeisen dell'Alto Adige, named Casse Rurali – Raiffeisen Finanziaria. That entity was the largest shareholder of Investitionsbank Trentino Südtirol – Mediocredito Trentino Alto Adige, an investment banking affiliate.

Another joint venture was Nord Est Asset Management S.A. (NEAM in short).

== See also ==
- List of European cooperative banks
- List of banks in the euro area
- List of banks in Italy
