= Federcasse =

Italian cooperative banking body

The Federazione Italiana delle Banche di Credito Cooperativo - Casse Rurali ed Artigiane (lit. 'Italian federation of cooperative credit banks - rural and artisanal cooperative banks'), abbreviated as Federcasse, is the nationwide umbrella organization of cooperative banks in Italy, based in Rome. Its oldest direct predecessor was the Federazione Italiana delle Casse Rurali Cattoliche (lit. 'Italian federation of Catholic rural cooperative banks'), established in 1909.

== History ==
=== Background and early development ===
The first Italian cooperative bank had been the Cassa Rurale a Loreggia in the province of Padua, created in 1883 at the initiative of economist and politician Leone Wollemborg following the model pioneered in Germany by Friedrich Wilhelm Raiffeisen. Several initiatives followed to establish representative organizations of the cooperative movement, including the Federazione fra le Casse Rurali e Sodalizi affini formed by 51 rural cooperative banks in 1888 and the Lega delle cooperative in 1893. By 1897, there were more than 900 cooperative banks in Italy, of which 775 directly supported by the Catholic Church in the wake of Pope Leo XIII's encyclical Rerum novarum of 1891.

The Federazione Italiana delle Casse Rurali Cattoliche was founded in September 1909 in Brescia. In 1919, the Federazione Italiana delle Casse Rurali joined the Confederazione Cooperative Italiane formed by Catholic cooperative banks seceding from the Lega delle cooperative, the latter being increasingly associated with Socialist politics. In 1926, the Fascist regime legislated the creation of the Associazione Nazionale tra le Casse Rurali ed Enti Assimilati whose head was appointed by the government.

=== After 1945 ===
Following postwar turmoil, the Federazione Italiana delle Casse Rurali e Artigiane was re-established in 1950. In 1963, it fostered the establishment of a central financial entity, the Istituto di Credito delle Casse Rurali e Artigiane or ICCREA. In 1973, two similar central financing entities (Italian: casse centrali) were established in Bolzano and Trento, respectively the Raiffeisen Landesbank Südtirol and Cassa Centrale delle Casse Rurali Trentine.

In 1978, the Fondo Centrale di Garanzia delle Casse Rurali ed Artigiane was established by the cooperative banks as a mutual protection arrangement that also provided Italy's first deposit guarantee scheme, emulated in 1987 by the Fondo Interbancario di Tutela dei Depositi (FITD) for all other Italian credit institutions. Meanwhile in 1981, the Federcasse became a member of the Associazione Bancaria Italiana. In 1993, the Testo Unico delle leggi in materia bancaria e creditizia (TUB), a codified version of Italian banking legislation, further removed previous specific constraints on cooperative banks in terms of governance and service offerings. In 1997, the Fondo di Garanzia dei Depositanti del Credito Cooperativo (FGD) replaced the Fondo Centrale di Garanzia, in line with EU legislation of 1994 on deposit guarantee schemes (94/19/EC). The FGD was complemented in 2004 with the Fondo Garanzia degli Obbligazionisti (FGO), which covers debt instruments subscribed by the cooperative banks' clients.

On 25 July 2008, an attempt was made to upgrade the mutual support scheme with the establishment of a Fondo di Garanzia Istituzionale del Credito Cooperativo (FGI) intended to cover all liabilities of the local cooperative banks. This initiative, however, did not come to fruition due to lack of support from various stakeholders.

=== Late-2010s consolidation ===
New legislation enacted in 2016 led to the formation by 2019 of three groups aggregating all Italian local cooperative banks, respectively centered on the financial institutions ICCREA in Rome, Cassa Centrale Banca in Trento, and Raiffeisen Landesbank Südtirol in Bolzano: these are now, respectively, the BCC Iccrea Group, Gruppo Cassa Centrale Banca, and South Tyrolean Raiffeisen Group. The first two are supervised on a consolidated basis as "significant institutions" under European banking supervision, whereas the latter is organized as an institutional protection scheme whose individual entities, including the central Landesbank, are directly supervised as "less significant institutions" by the Bank of Italy.

== Regional federations ==
Despite the recent consolidation, the Federcasse has maintained its previous structure based on regional associations of local cooperative banks:

- Federazione Abruzzo e Molise BCC in Abruzzo and Molise
- Federazione Calabrese BCC in Calabria
- Federazione Campana BCC in Campania
- Federazione Cooperative Raiffeisen in South Tyrol
- Federazione Emilia Romagna BCC in Emilia-Romagna
- Federazione Friuli Venezia Giulia BCC in Friuli-Venezia Giulia
- Federazione Lazio, Umbria e Sardegna BCC in Lazio, Umbria and Sardinia
- Federazione Lombarda BCC in Lombardy
- Federazione Marchigiana BCC in Marche
- Federazione Piemonte, Valle d'Aosta e Liguria BCC in Piedmont, Aosta Valley and Liguria
- Federazione Puglia e Basilicata BCC in Apulia and Basilicata
- Federazione Siciliana BCC in Sicily
- Federazione Trentina della cooperazione in Trentino
- Federazione Toscana BCC in Tuscany
- Federazione Veneta BCC in Veneto

== See also ==
- Bundesverband der Deutschen Volksbanken und Raiffeisenbanken
- Österreichischer Raiffeisenverband
