= Banca di Roma =

Former Italian bank

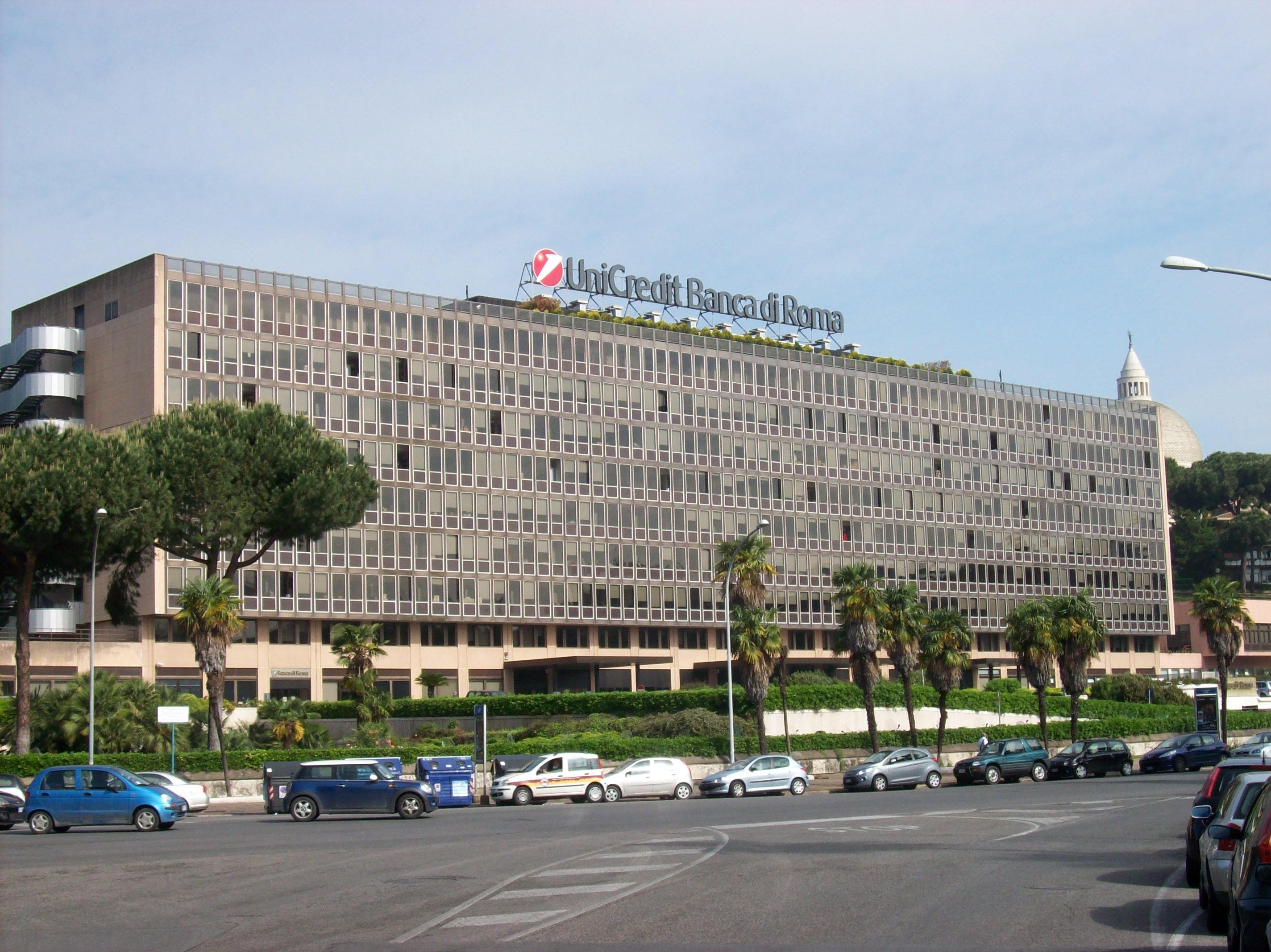
- Head office building in EUR, Rome
- Native name: UniCredit Banca di Roma S.p.A.
- Company type: Subsidiary (former listed company)
- Industry: Financial services
- Founded: 1992
- Defunct: 2010
- Fate: Absorbed by parent company
- Headquarters: 180 Viale Tupini, Rome, Italy
- Products: Retail and corporate banking
- Net income: ▲€216.967 million (2009)
- Total assets: ▲€50.734 billion (2009)
- Total equity: ▲€1.426 billion (2009)
- Owner: UniCredit (100%)
- Parent: UniCredit
- Capital ratio: ▲12.69% (Tier 1)
- Website: Official website
- Footnotes / references source

Banca di Roma was an Italian bank based in Rome, formed in 1992 by merger of Banco di Santo Spirito and Banco di Roma. From 2008 it was a subsidiary of UniCredit under the name UniCredit Banca di Roma S.p.A.. In 2010 the subsidiary was absorbed into the bank, but retained as a registered trademark.

In 2008 the bank had 1533 branches: 608 in Lazio, 219 in Campania, 173 in Apulia, 171 in Tuscany, 99 in Marche, 84 in Umbria, 59 in Sardegna, 49 in Abruzzo, 38 in Molise, 23 in Calabria and 10 in Basilicata. (Sicily and Northern Italy were served by sister companies Banco di Sicilia and UniCredit Banca respectively)

== History ==
Banca di Roma S.p.A. was formed by the merger of Banco di Santo Spirito, Banco di Roma and Cassa di Risparmio di Roma. In 1991 the banking section of Cassa di Risparmio di Roma was absorbed by Banco di Santo Spirito, as Legge Amato required all saving banks of Italy (Italian: Cassa di Risparmio) had to transform into S.p.A. (company limited by shares). The owner, Fondazione Cassa di Risparmio di Roma, chose not to form an independent bank but a holding company "Cassa di Risparmio di Roma Holding" (aka Società Italiana di Partecipazioni Bancarie). In 1992 Banco di Santo Spirito was merged with Banco di Roma to form Banca di Roma (changing the name from Banco to the more modern form Banca). In 1992 the bank acquired a minority interests in Cassa di Risparmio della Provincia dell'Aquila, which was sold in 1998.

Banca di Roma absorbed subsidiary "Banca di Roma Holding" in 1994.

=== Banca di Roma Group ===
Banca di Roma became a banking group in the late 1990s which acquired Banca Mediterranea, Banco di Sicilia and Mediocredito Centrale. Mediocredito di Roma, a subsidiary of Banca di Roma, revered merger with Mediocredito Centrale in 2000.

In 2000 Banca di Roma privatized Banca Mediterranea (became Nuova Banca Mediterranea).

In 2001 Banca di Roma sold Nuova Banca Mediterranea to a consortium headed by Banca Popolare di Bari and Veneto Banca, which Banca Mediterranea was dismantled in 2002.

=== As a division of Capitalia ===
In 2002, Banca di Roma Group merged with Bipop Carire to form Capitalia. In 2007 Capitalia was acquired by UniCredit, which Banca di Roma became its subsidiary instead.

=== As a subsidiary of UniCredit ===
In 2008, 11 branches were sold to Banca Carige. The bank was also incorporated as a new company UniCredit Banca di Roma S.p.A. (P.IVA 09976231002). The bank received all the branches of the group in South and Central Italy, with sister company UniCredit Banca was specialized in Northern Italy.

In 2010, UniCredit Banca, Banca di Roma and Banco di Sicilia were absorbed into UniCredit.

== See also ==
- Banca di Credito Cooperativo di Roma
- List of banks in Italy
