= Leone Wollemborg =

Italian economist and politician

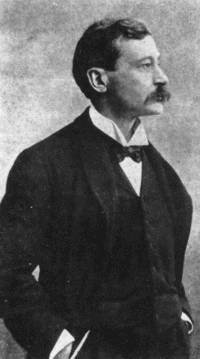
- Born: 4 March 1859; Padua, Italy
- Died: 19 August 1932 (aged 73)
- Occupation(s): Economist; politician

Leone Wollemborg (4 March 1859 – 19 August 1932) was an Italian economist and politician. He made significant contributions to the spread of co-operative enterprises, specifically rural credit unions and agricultural co-operative banks.

Leone was born in Padua on 4 March 1859. At fifteen, he enrolled in the University of Padua and graduated in law 4 years later with a thesis on autonomous tax municipalities. He had memorized all of the poems of Heinrich Heine and was studying the works of Friedrich Wilhelm Raiffeisen. Wollemborg and a group of about 30 farm workers and small landowners founded Italy's first rural credit union in Loreggia in 1883 (several Banca Popolare found before 1883). The intent of the bank was to help tenants, small landowners and agricultural workers to rise from poverty by granting loans at low interest and with long deadlines. In 1885, he established the monthly publication Cooperazione rurale (Rural Co-operation), which was published until 1904.

== Bibliography ==
- Wollemborg Leone, Scritti e discorsi di economia e finanza, Turin, 1935.

== See also ==
- Cooperative banking
- Credit union
- History of credit unions
- Luigi Luzzatti
