= Alpen Privatbank =

Austrian private bank founded in 2022

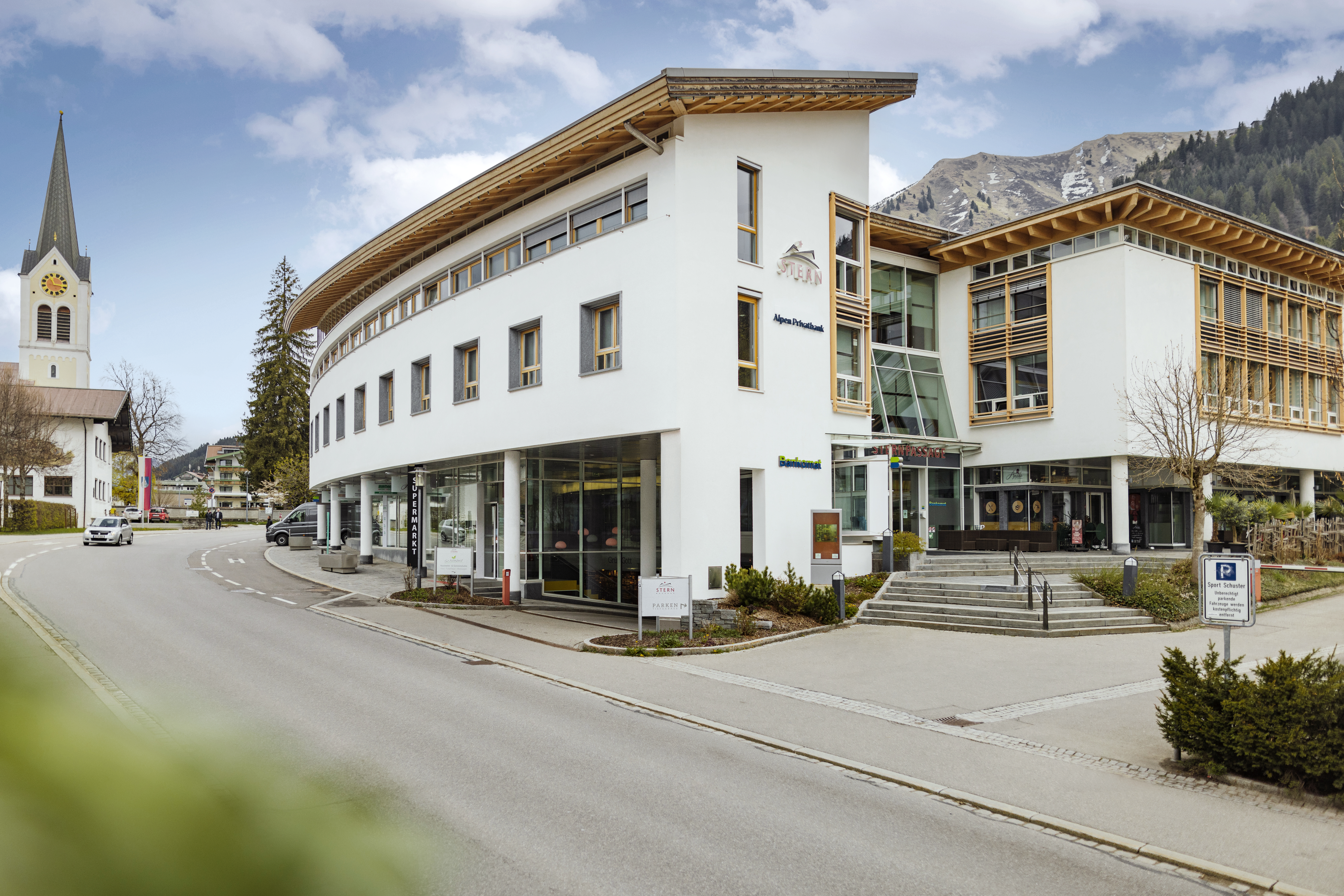
- Type: Corporation
- Founded: 2022; 4 years ago
- Headquarters: Riezlern (Vorarlberg), Austria
- Total assets: €2.7 billion (2023)
- Number of employees: 110 (2023)
- Website: www.alpenprivatbank.com

Alpen Privatbank is a private bank in western Austria. It operates in Riezlern (headquarter), Innsbruck, Salzburg, Düsseldorf and Stuttgart. Its clients are primarily high net worth individuals from Tyrol, Salzburg, northern Italy, Bavaria, North Rhine-Westphalia and Baden-Württemberg. The customer volumes under management amount to approximately € 2.7 billion.

== History ==
Alpen Privatbank emerged in 2022 from the merger of AlpenBank (founded in 1983 as Save-Rössler-Bank AG, renamed AlpenBank in 1991 and majority shareholding acquired by Raiffeisen-Landesbank Tirol AG in 1998) with the private banking unit of Walser Raiffeisen Bank (founded in 1894 as a cooperative "Spar- und Darlehenskassenverein)."

== Structure ==
The main shareholders of Alpen Privatbank are Walser Raiffeisen Holding eGen (71%), Raiffeisen Landesbank Südtirol AG (16.5%) and Raiffeisen Landesbank Tirol AG (12.5%).

== Services and support ==
Alpen Privatbank specialises in sophisticated wealth management and investment advice for private investors and entrepreneurs. The core business of Alpen Privatbank is traditional private banking without collisions of interest through issuing transactions or investment banking. Alpen Privatbank is not a universal bank, does not manage classic current accounts and is only active in the Lombard lending in the credit sector. In addition, Alpen Privatbank regularly publishes on current topics (perspectives, in-house opinion) and is present with lectures and events on financial topics.
