= Banca di Credito Cooperativo di Roma =

BCC Roma
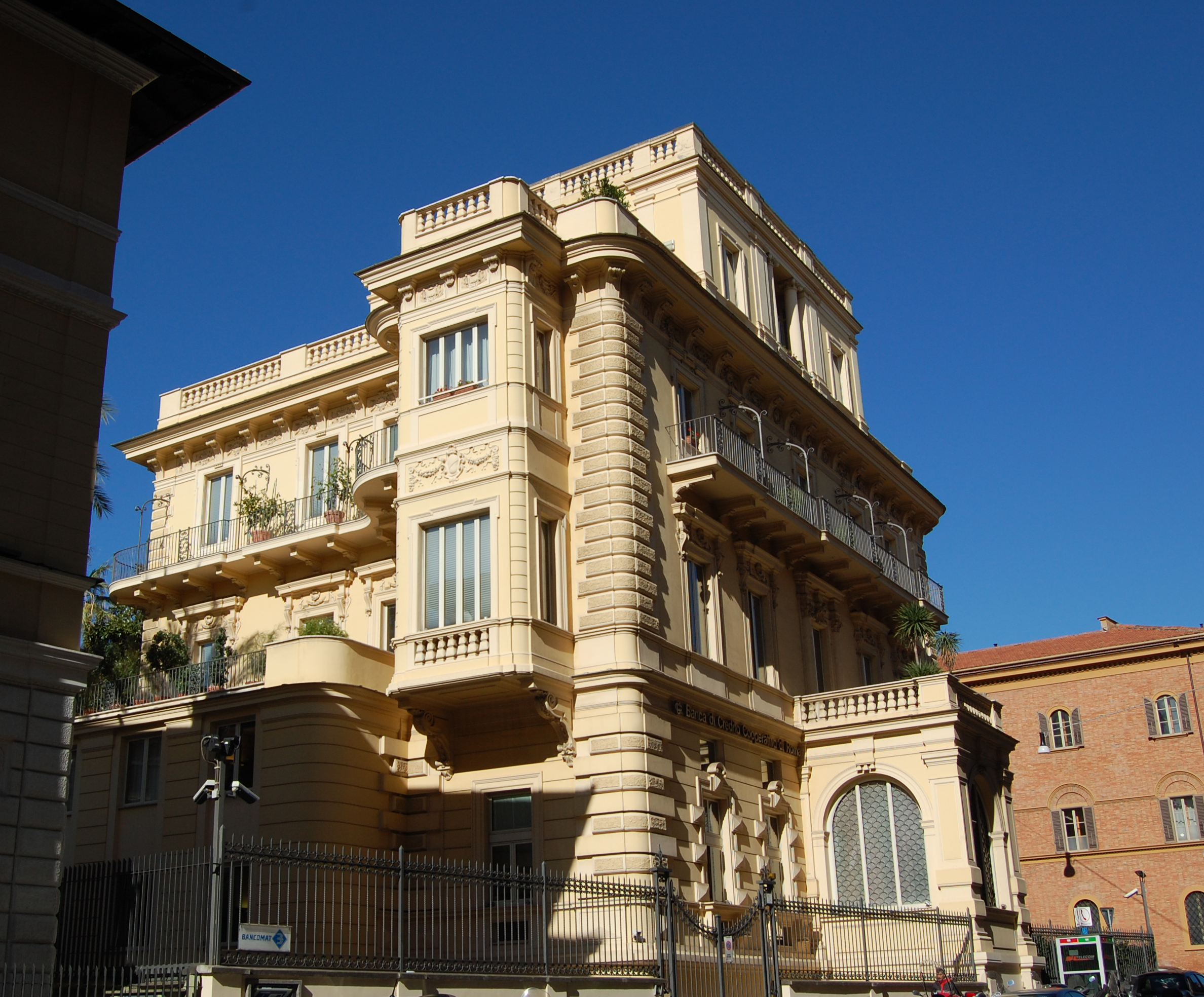
- Banca di Credito Cooperativo di Roma, Headquarters in Rome.
- Native name: Banca di Credito Cooperativo di Roma
- Formerly: Cassa Rurale ed Artigiana dell'Agro Romano; Cassa Rurale e Artigiana di Roma
- Company type: Società cooperativa
- Industry: Financial services, Retail and commercial banking
- Founded: 1954 in Rome
- Headquarters: 129 via Sardegna, Rome, Italy
- Area served: Lazio region; Province of L'Aquila, Abruzzo; Province of Padova, Treviso, Verona, Vicenza, Venezia, Veneto; Province of Isernia, Molise
- Key people: Maurizio Longhi (chairman of supervisory board); Gabriele Gravina (chairman of managing board); Gilberto Cesandri (general manager)

Banca di Credito Cooperativo di Roma is an Italian cooperative bank based in Rome, Lazio region. The bank is a member of Federazione Italiana delle Banche di Credito Cooperativo - Casse Rurali ed Artigiane (Federcasse) and Federazione delle Banche di Credito Cooperativo del Lazio Umbria Sardegna (27.98% stake). The bank is a minority shareholders of ICCREA Holding (3.60%).

The bank originated as a rural credit union. The bank was supervised by the board of directors, (supervisory board) which also appointed 9 directors as managing directors (managing board). The chairman of board of directors is Maurizio Longhi.

== See also ==
- Banca di Roma
- Banca Popolare di Roma
- Banca Popolare di Roma (1992–2002)
- Banca Popolare del Lazio
