= Cooperative banking =

Type of retail or commercial bank organized cooperatively

Cooperative banking is retail and commercial banking organized on a cooperative basis. Cooperative banking institutions take deposits and lend money in most parts of the world.

Cooperative banking, as discussed here, includes retail banking carried out by credit unions, mutual savings banks, building societies and cooperatives, as well as commercial banking services provided by mutual organizations (such as cooperative federations) to cooperative businesses.

== Institutions ==
=== Cooperative banks ===
Cooperative banks are owned by their customers and follow the cooperative principle of one person, one vote. Co-operative banks are often regulated under both banking and cooperative legislation. They provide services such as savings and loans to non-members as well as to members, and some participate in the wholesale markets for bonds, money and even equities. Many cooperative banks are traded on public stock markets, with the result that they are partly owned by non-members. Member control can be diluted by these outside stakes, so they may be regarded as semi-cooperative.

Cooperative banking systems are also usually more integrated than credit union systems. Local branches of co-operative banks select their own boards of directors and manage their own operations, but most strategic decisions require approval from a central office. Credit unions usually retain strategic decision-making at a local level, though they share back-office functions, such as access to the global payments system, by federating.

Some cooperative banks are criticized for diluting their cooperative principles. Principles 2-4 of the "Statement on the Co-operative Identity" can be interpreted to require that members must control both the governance systems and capital of their cooperatives. A cooperative bank that raises capital on public stock markets creates a second class of shareholders who compete with the members for control. In some circumstances, the members may lose control. This effectively means that the bank ceases to be a cooperative. Accepting deposits from non-members may also lead to a dilution of member control.

=== Credit unions ===
Credit unions have the purpose of promoting thrift, providing credit at reasonable rates, and providing other financial services to its members. Its members are usually required to share a common bond, such as locality, employer, religion or profession, and credit unions are usually funded entirely by member deposits, and avoid outside borrowing. They are typically (though not exclusively) the smaller form of cooperative banking institution. In some countries they are restricted to providing only unsecured personal loans, whereas in others, they can provide business loans to farmers, and mortgages.

=== Land development banks ===
The special banks providing Long Term Loans are called Land Development Banks (LDBs). The first LDB was started at Jhang in Punjab in 1920. This bank is also based on a cooperative. The main objective of the LDBs are to promote the development of land, agriculture and increase the agricultural production. The LDBs provide long-term finance to members directly through their branches.

=== Building societies ===
Building societies exist in Britain, Ireland and several Commonwealth countries. They are similar to credit unions in organisation, though few enforce a common bond. However, rather than promoting thrift and offering unsecured and business loans, their purpose is to provide home mortgages for members. Borrowers and depositors are society members, setting policy and appointing directors on a one-member, one-vote basis. Building societies often provide other retail banking services, such as current accounts, credit cards and personal loans. In the United Kingdom, regulations permit up to half of their lending to be funded by debt to non-members, allowing societies to access wholesale bond and money markets to fund mortgages. The world's largest building society is Britain's Nationwide Building Society.

=== Others ===
Mutual savings banks and mutual savings and loan associations were very common in the 19th and 20th centuries, but declined in number and market share in the late 20th century, becoming globally less significant than cooperative banks, building societies and credit unions.

Trustee savings banks are similar to other savings banks, but they are not cooperatives, as they are controlled by trustees, rather than their depositors.

=== International associations ===
The most important international associations of cooperative banks are the Brussels-based European Association of Co-operative Banks which has 28 European and non-European members, and the Paris-based International Cooperative Banking Association (ICBA), which has member institutions from around the world too.

== By region ==
=== Canada ===
In Canada, cooperative banking is provided by credit unions (caisses populaires in French). As of September 30, 2012, there were 357 credit unions and caisses populaires affiliated with Credit Union Central of Canada. They operated 1,761 branches across the country with 5.3 million members and $149.7 billion in assets.

=== Quebec ===
The caisse populaire movement started by Alphonse Desjardins in Quebec, Canada, pioneered credit unions. Desjardins opened the first credit union in North America in 1900, from his home in Lévis, Quebec, marking the beginning of the Mouvement Desjardins. He was interested in bringing financial protection to working people.

=== United Kingdom ===
British building societies developed into general-purpose savings and banking institutions with ‘one member, one vote’ ownership and can be seen as a form of financial cooperative (although many de-mutualised into conventionally owned banks in the 1980s and 1990s). Until 2017, the Co-operative Group included The Co-operative Bank; however, despite its name, the Co-operative Bank was not itself a true co-operative as it was not owned directly by its members. Instead it was part-owned by a holding company which was itself a co-operative – the Co-operative Banking Group. It still retains an insurance provider, The Co-operative Insurance, noted for promoting ethical investment. For the financial year 2021/2022, the British building society sector had assets of around £483, of which more than half were accounted for by the cooperative Nationwide Building Society.

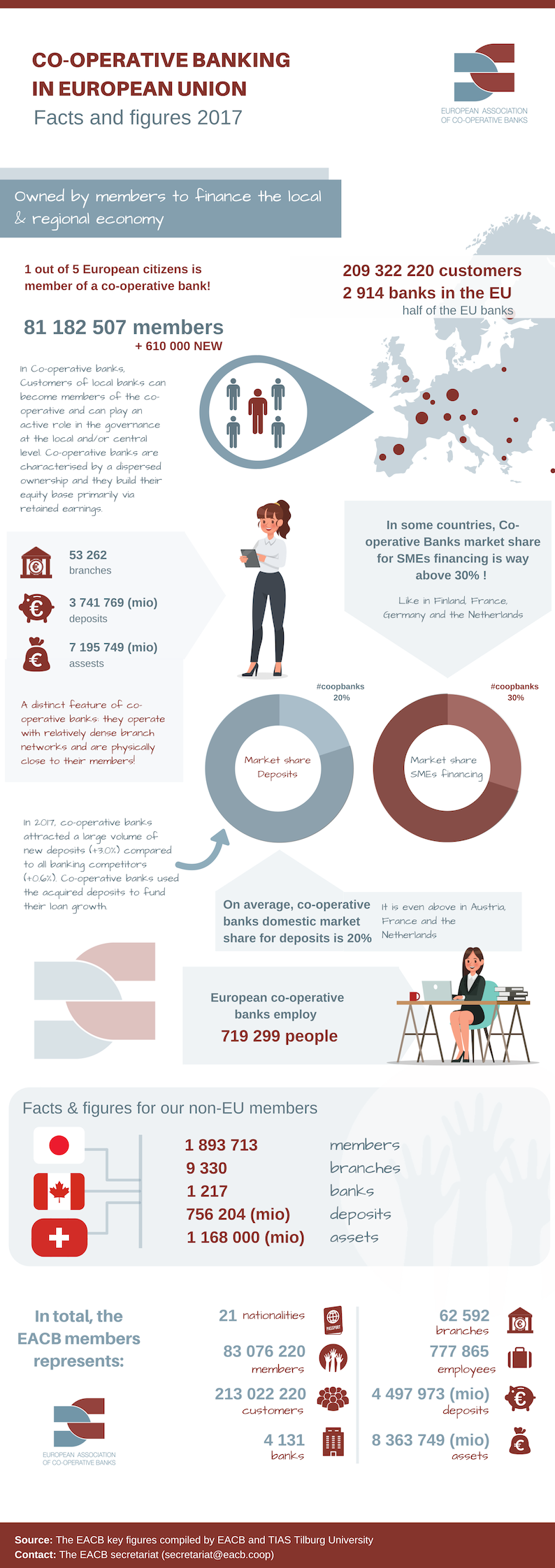
European Co-operative Banking: Facts and figures 2017. Based on the 2017 Key statistics collected by the EACB.

=== Continental Europe ===
Important continental cooperative banking systems include the Crédit Agricole, Crédit Mutuel, and Groupe BPCE in France, Grupo Caja Rural and Cajamar Cooperative Group in Spain, Rabobank in the Netherlands, the German Cooperative Financial Group in Germany, ICCREA Banca and Cassa Centrale Banca - Credito Cooperativo Italiano in Italy, Migros and Coop Bank in Switzerland, and the Raiffeisen Banking Group in Austria. The cooperative banks that are members of the European Association of Co-operative Banks have 130 million customers, 4 trillion euros in assets, and 17% of Europe's deposits. The International Confederation of Cooperative Banks (CIBP) is the oldest association of cooperative banks at international level.

In the Nordic countries, there is a clear distinction between mutual savings banks (Sparbank) and true credit unions (Andelsbank).

In Italy, a 2015 reform required popular banks (Italian: Banca Popolare) with assets of greater than €8 billion to demutualize into joint-stock companies (Italian: società per azioni).

=== United States ===
Credit unions in the United States had 96.3 million members in 2013 and assets of $1.06 trillion. The sector had five times lower failure rate than other banks during the 2008 financial crisis and more than doubled lending to small businesses between 2008 and 2016, from $30 billion to $60 billion, while lending to small businesses overall during the same period declined by around $100 billion.

Public trust in credit unions in the United States stands at 60%, compared to 30% for big banks and small businesses are 80% less likely to be dissatisfied with a credit union than with a big bank.

=== India ===
Cooperative banks serve an important role in the Indian economy, especially in rural areas. In urban areas, they mainly serve to small industry and self-employed workers. They are registered under the Cooperative Societies Act, 1912. They are regulated by the Reserve Bank of India under the Banking Regulation Act, 1949 and Banking Laws (Application to Cooperative Societies) Act, 1965. Anyonya Sahakari Mandali, established in 1889 in the province of Baroda, is the earliest known cooperative credit union in India.

The Cooperative Credit System in India consists of Short Term and Long Term credit institutions. The short-term credit structure which takes care of the short term (1 to 5 years) credit needs of the farmers is a three-tier structure in most of the States viz., Primary Agricultural Cooperative Societies (PACCS) at the village level, District Central Cooperative Banks at the District level and State Cooperative Bank at the State level and two-tier in some States voz., State Cooperative Banks and PACCS. The long term credit structure caters to the long term credit needs of the farmers (up to 20 years) is a two-tier structure with Primary Agriculture and Rural Development Banks (PARDBs) at the village level and State Agriculture and Rural Development Banks. The State Cooperative Banks and Central Cooperative Banks are licensed by Reserve Bank of India under the Banking Regulation Act. While the StCBs and DCCBs function like a normal Bank they focus mainly on agricultural credit. While Reserve Bank of India is the Regulating Authority, National Bank for Agriculture and Rural Development (NABARD) provides refinance support and takes care of inspection of StCBs and DCCBs. The first Cooperative Credit Society in India was started in 1904 at Thiroor in Tiruvallur District in Tamil Nadu

Primary Cooperative Banks which are otherwise known as Urban Cooperative Banks are registered as Cooperative Societies under the Cooperative Societies Acts of the concerned States or the Multi-State Cooperative Societies Act function in urban areas and their business is similar to that of Commercial Banks. They are licensed by RBI to do banking business. Reserve Bank of India is both the controlling and inspecting authority for the Primary Cooperative Banks.

=== Israel ===
Ofek (Hebrew: אופק) is a cooperative initiative founded in mid-2012 that intended to establish the first cooperative bank in Israel.

== Microcredit and microfinance ==
The recent phenomena of microcredit and microfinance are often based on a cooperative model. These focus on small business lending. In 2006, Muhammad Yunus, founder of the Grameen Bank in Bangladesh, won the Nobel Peace Prize for his ideas regarding development and his pursuit of the microcredit concept. In this concept the institution provides micro loans to people who couldn't otherwise secure loans through conventional means.

However, cooperative banking differs from modern microfinance. Particularly, members’ control over financial resources is the distinguishing feature between the cooperative model and modern microfinance. The not-for-profit orientation of modern microfinance has gradually been replaced by full-cost recovery and self-sustainable microfinance approaches. The microfinance model has been gradually absorbed by market-oriented or for-profit institutions in most underdeveloped economies. The current dominant model of microfinance, whether it is provided by not-for-profit or for-profit institutions, places the control over financial resources and their allocation in the hands of a small number of microfinance providers that benefit from the highly profitable sector.

Cooperative banking is different in many aspects from standard microfinance institutions, both for-profit and not-for-profit organizations. Although group lending may seemingly share some similarities with cooperative concepts, in terms of joint liability, the distinctions are much bigger, especially when it comes to autonomy, mobilization and control over resources, legal and organizational identity, and decision-making. Early financial cooperatives founded in Germany were more able to provide larger loans relative to the borrowers’ income, with longer-term maturity at lower interest rates compared to modern standard microfinance institutions. The main source of funds for cooperatives are local savings, while microfinance institutions in underdeveloped economies rely heavily on donations, foreign funds, external borrowing, or retained earnings, which implies high-interest rates. High-interest rates, short-term maturities, and tight repayment schedules are destructive instruments for low- and middle-income borrowers which may lead to serious debt traps, or in best scenarios will not support any sort of capital accumulation. Without improving the ability of agents to earn, save, and accumulate wealth, there are no real economic gains from financial markets to the lower- and middle-income populations.

== List of cooperative banking institutions ==
Cooperative banking institutions
Name	Country	Members (2010)	Assets (2010 US$ billion)	Type	Alternative name	Notes
Saraswati Bank	India	1,000,000	9.8	Bank		Largest Asian co-operative bank
Coop Bank Pertama (formerly known as Bank Persatuan)	Malaysia	300,000+		Islamic cooperative bank	Koperasi Co-opbank Pertama Malaysia Berhad	The first national cooperative bank in Malaysia established in 1950
Bank Rakyat	Malaysia	907,918		Islamic cooperative bank	Bank Kerjasama Rakyat Malaysia Berhad	Second national cooperative bank in Malaysia founded in 1954
Crédit agricole SA	France	52,000,000		Bank (Public S.A.)	Caisse Nationale de Crédit Agricol	Local banks of the group majority owned by individuals; local banks jointly owned Crédit Agricole S.A. indirectly, via regional bank of the group
Islami Co-operative Bank Ltd. (Instead of Sandwip Central Co-Operative Bank Ltd.)	Bangladesh			Central Co-Operative Bank	ICBL	First Islami and largest Co-operative Bank in Bangladesh based on Islami Sariyah. Signed: Registration No. 57/c, Dated: 3 August 1922. Head office: Zakir Hossain Road, Khulshi, Chittagong-4209, Bangladesh.
Crelan	Belgium	288,000		Bank	formerly Landbouwkrediet (agricultural)	Independent from Crédit Agricole since 2015
DZ Bank	Germany	17,700,000		Bank	Deutsche Zentralgenossenschaftbank; German Central Cooperative Bank	Owned by three quarters of all German cooperative banks
Caisse d'Épargne	France	30,000,000		Bank	literally “savings bank”	Credit union federation
Rabobank	Netherlands	1,500,000+		Bank		Credit union federation
Nationwide Building Society	UK	15,500,000		Building society		World's largest building society
Bangladesh Samabaya Bank LTD.	Bangladesh			Bank		The largest Co-Operative Bank in Bangladesh with 478 Registered Member Society.
Groupe Banque Populaire	France	3,400,000		Bank		
Desjardins Group	Canada	5,795,277		Credit union federation		Leading bank in Quebec
Raiffeisen Bank International	Austria			Bank (Public aktiengesellschaft)	RI	Owned by regional Raiffeisen Bank of Austrian states
Nonghyup	South Korea			Banking division of agricultural cooperative	National Agricultural Cooperative Federation (NACF)	Approximately US$230 billion in loans
ICCREA Banca	Italy			Bank (società per azioni)	Istituto Centrale delle Casse Rurali ed Artigiane	Owned by credit unions of Italy
Cassa Centrale Banca – Credito Cooperativo del Nord Est	Italy			Bank (società per azioni)	CCB	Owned by credit union of Northern Italy
Raiffeisen Landesbank Südtirol	Italy			Bank (società per azioni)	Cassa Centrale Raiffeisen dell'Alto Adige	Owned by credit union of South Tyrol region, Italy
Raiffeisen (Switzerland)	Switzerland					Credit union federation
Banco Cooperativo Español and Caja Rural	Spain					
OP Financial Group	Finland	1,750,000				31% share of Finnish credit market, and 32% share of savings and deposit market
POP Bank Group	Finland					Credit union federation
S-Bank	Finland	2,900,000		Cooperative supermarket bank	S-Pankki (Finnish), S-Banken (Swedish)	Belongs to the S Group retail cooperative
Bank Australia	Australia	125,000+	3	bank		Australia's first customer owned bank
Navy Federal Credit Union	US	3,004,352	3.3	Credit union		
Shared Interest	UK			Cooperative lending society		Finance for fair trade
GLS Bank	Germany					
The Cooperative Bank	New Zealand	120,000+		Bank		Customer owned bank
Banco Credicoop	Argentina					
Laboral Kutxa	Spain			Credit union		Part of Mondragon Corporation

== Impact ==
=== 2008 financial crisis ===
A 2013 report by ILO concluded that cooperative banks outperformed their competitors during the 2008 financial crisis. The cooperative banking sector had a 20% market share of the European banking sector, but accounted for only 7% of all the write-downs and losses between the third quarter of 2007 and first quarter of 2011. Cooperative banks were also over-represented in lending to small and medium-sized businesses in all of the 10 countries included in the report.

Credit unions in the US had five times the lower failure rate of other banks during the crisis and more than doubled lending to small businesses between 2008 and 2016, from $30 billion to $60 billion, while lending to small businesses overall during the same period declined by around $100 billion.

== See also ==
- Building society
- Credit union
- Mutual savings bank
- Rotating savings and credit association
- Savings and loan association
- List of European cooperative banks
