= DEME =

Belgian dredging company

- Type: Limited company
- Founded: 1991
- Headquarters: Zwijndrecht, Belgium
- Area served: Worldwide
- Key people: Luc Bertrand (chairman of the Board of Directors), Luc Vandenbulcke (Executive Director and CEO)
- Services: Dredging, land reclamation, port construction, marine contracting, oil & gas, environmental remediation, farshore windfarms, geographic information system
- Revenue: ▲€4.154 billion (2025)
- Operating income: ▲€931 million (2025)
- Net income: ▲€346 million (2025)
- Total assets: ▲€6.204 billion (2025)
- Number of employees: approx. 6,000 (2025)
- Website: www.deme-group.com

Dredging, Environmental and Marine Engineering NV (DEME) is an international group of specialised companies in the fields of capital and maintenance dredging, land reclamation, port infrastructure development, offshore related services for the oil & gas industry, offshore windfarm installation, and environmental remediation. The group is based in Zwijndrecht, Belgium, and has current operations on five continents.

== History ==
DEME was established as a holding company of two Belgian dredging contractors: Dredging International and Baggerwerken Decloedt. Two industrial and financial Groups currently control the share capital: Ackermans & van Haaren, a publicly listed Antwerp-based industrial investment Group; and CFE, a publicly listed civil contractor controlled by the French Vinci-Group.

Baggerwerken Decloedt has been active in maintenance and capital dredging along the Belgian coast since 1875. Dredging International in itself is a merger of two dredging companies in September 1974: Ackermans & van Haaren, and Société Générale de Dragage (SGD). Ackermans & van Haaren was established in 1852, Société Générale de Dragage was incorporated in 1930. Both companies, Baggerwerken Decloedt and Dredging International have been involved in the construction of the main Belgian ports and the deepening and maintenance of their navigation channels in the North Sea and the river Scheldt. Since their early beginnings they have operated on a worldwide basis, on all continents simultaneously.

== General ==
DEME's tagline is Creating Land for the Future. The company colours are blue and green, representing the boundary between water (blue) and land (green). The corporate logo features the head of a cutter-suction dredger (CSD), underlined with a blue and green bar. The group is made up of 71 different companies, subsidiaries, branches and representative offices worldwide. In 2009 DEME companies were operating in 42 countries.

== Fleet ==
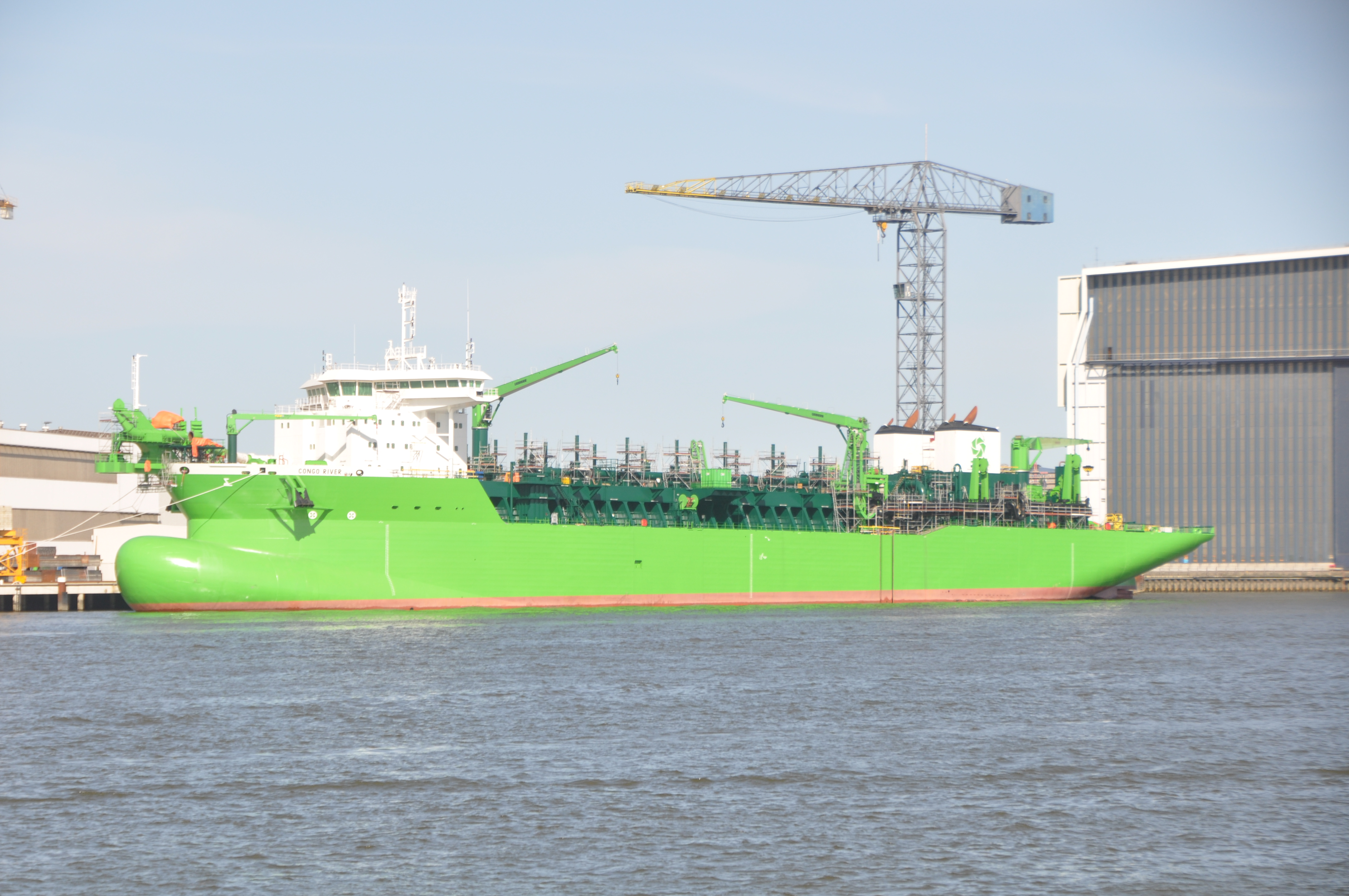
The trailing suction hopper dredger TSHD Congo River (capacity 30,000 m^{3}) is one of the largest ships in the DEME fleet.

In 2009 DEME had a fleet of almost 300 vessels, including over 80 main dredging and hydraulic engineering vessels. At the end of 2009 DEME owned and operated 25 trailing suction hopper dredgers (TSHDs) such as the Jade River, with a capacity from 1,635 to 30,000 m^{3}. They also owned the 24,130 m^{3} Pearl River which was the first megatrailer in the world when she was commissioned in 1994. The group owned and operated 20 cutter suction dredgers (CSDs), with installed power between 441 kW and 28,200 kW. The CSD fleet includes the world's heaviest self-propelled and ocean-going rock breaker, the 28,200 kW d'Artagnan. D'Artagnan was built for DEME's French subsidiary Société de Dragage International (SDI) and launched in 2005.

Other ships include backhoe dredgers (e.g. the 2,600 kW Pinocchio); lifting vessels (e.g. the 3,300 tons Rambiz); self-elevating drilling platforms (e.g. the 1,600 tons Goliath); fallpipe vessels (e.g. the 19,000 tons Flintstone); and auxiliary equipment. In 2010 DEME appointed Wilhelmsen Ships Service as their supplier for maintenance products and technical gases globally.

== Operating companies ==
Operating companies of DEME share a common flag, colours and tagline. However, each keeps their own identity, operational autonomy, and legal structure. Some of the operating companies of DEME include:

=== Dredging International ===
Dredging International is one of the major operating companies of DEME and focuses on these core activities: capital and maintenance dredging; deepening and maintaining navigation channels; major port development; reclamation of new industrial or residential areas, artificial islands or beaches; and coastal protection. It was founded in Antwerp, Belgium where its constituent companies began capital and maintenance dredging on the Schelde at the end of the 19th century. Dredging International has subsidiaries, branches and representative offices in Spain, Portugal, the United Kingdom, Russia, Mexico, Uruguay, India, Nigeria, Bahrain, Panama, Venezuela, Singapore, Australia, China, Taiwan, Vietnam, Brazil, Ghana, Luxembourg, Finland, Dubai, Abu Dhabi, Angola, Saudi Arabia and Latvia. Dredging International is an associated company in Middle East Dredging Company QSC (MEDCO).

=== Baggerwerken Decloedt & Zoon ===
Baggerwerken Decloedt & Zoon works on capital and maintenance dredging; deepening and maintaining navigation channels; major port development; reclamation of new industrial or residential areas, artificial islands or beaches; and coastal protection. Baggerwerken Decloedt & Zoon started its business with capital and maintenance dredging in the coastal areas of Belgium. Today Baggerwerken Decloedt & Zoon operate globally with assignments on all continents. Until 2000 the De Cloedt family was a major shareholder in Baggerwerken Decloedt & Zoon.

=== DEME Offshore ===
DEME Offshore was founded in 2019 with the merging of the three former offshore companies of DEME: GeoSea, Tideway, and A2Sea. The company focuses on the renewables and oil and gas sectors. The portfolio of services for the renewables sector includes foundation, turbine and substation transport and installation, cable laying, operations and maintenance activities, engineering, procurement, construction and installation, and Balance of Plant contracts. For oil and gas, services includes landfalls and offshore civil works, rock placement, heavy lifting, subsea construction, umbilical laying, and the installation and decommissioning of offshore platforms. Through its subsidiaries Cathie Associates and G-tec, DEME Offshore also offers geoscience services.

DEME Offshore operates these vessels: heavy-lift vessel (Orion), jack-up vessels (Innovation, Apollo, Sea Installer, Sea Challenger, Neptune, Thor, Goliath), rock-installation vessels (Flintstone, Rolling Stone, Seahorse), cable-lay vessel (Living Stone) and drilling vessel (Omalius).

=== DEME Environmental Contractors (DEC) ===
DEME Environmental Contractors (DEC) was incorporated in 1999 as a merger of various DEME companies that were established in the 1980s: NV Soils was a specialised company for soil washing and in-situ soil remediation techniques; NV Silt had expertise in silt recycling and sludge treatment; and NV Bitumar focused on bituminous materials for hydraulic engineering and fibrous stone asphalt for coastal engineering. DEC is specialised in groundwater and soil remediation; sediment treatment; recycling and landfill techniques; environmental dredging; and the redevelopment of brownfields. DEC owns and operates seven permitted soil and sediment recycling centres in Belgium, including in the ports of Antwerp, Zeebrugge, and Ghent. DEC is part of DEME-controlled Ecoterres Holding, where all environmental activities of DEME are brought together. Other DEME-environmental companies under Ecoterres Holding include de Vries & van de Wiel (Netherlands); Ecoterres (Wallonia, Belgium); and Extract-Ecoterres (France). Two new DEC-subsidiaries were established in October 2010: Purazur provides water treatment and industrial wastewater treatment services and Terrenata provides purchasing, remediation and redevelopment of brownfield land. Terrenata is business partnering with BPI and Extensa, the project development companies of the two DEME shareholders.

=== Joint ventures ===
DEME is part of several joint ventures with other companies such as Middle East Dredging Company (MEDCO), a partnership of DEME with the Qatari United Development Company (UDC) and the Qatari government. MEDCO focuses on dredging and land reclamation projects in the Gulf.

In 2004, International Seaport Dredging (ISD) was incorporated in India as a joint venture with Larsen & Toubro. ISD focuses on port development and land reclamation in India.

Scaldis Salvage & Marine Contractors is another joint venture partly owned by DEME. Scaldis is involved with wreck removal and heavy lifting. DEME has a stake of 55 per cent in Scaldis. DEME is also invested in C-Power, the constructors of Thorntonbank Wind Farm off the Belgian coast.

==== DEME Blue Energy (DBE) ====
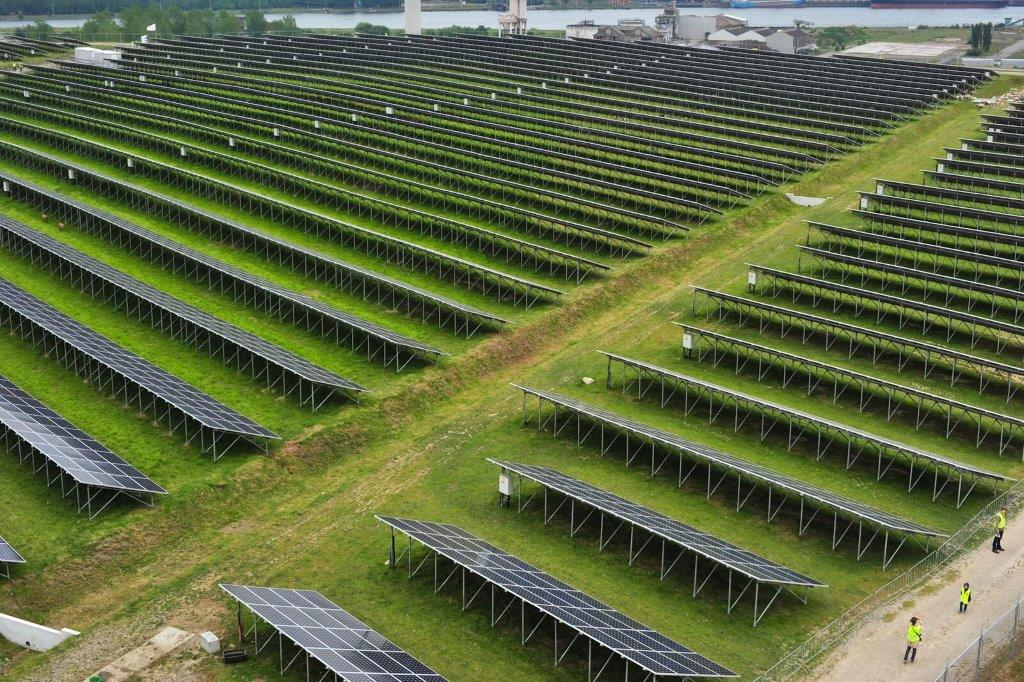
Solar panel farm installed on the former gypsum disposal site of Nilefos Chemie in Zelzate in Belgium after site remediation of this now defunct phosphate ore treatment plant. The site is also known as the gipsberg (gypsum mountain).

DEME established DEME Blue Energy (DBE). DBE focuses on wave energy and tidal energy, including the development of prototype equipment that could be used to generate electricity. In 2010, a consortium of industrial partners named Flanders Electricity from the Sea (FlanSea), submitted a research project for developing a wave energy converter (WEC) which will undergo an instrumented test in the summer of 2012. DBE is a member of the FlanSea consortium, together with Ghent University, the port of Oostende (Ostend), and others. If successful, the new technology could be installed in between the offshore wind turbines of the Thorntonbank Wind Farm, linking two different sources of renewable energy. In September 2010, the Flemish Agency for Innovation by Science and Technology (IWT) granted a €2.4 million subsidy for the FlanSea project. The FlanSea wave energy converter will be a point absorber, modelled after the B1-device off Southeast Norway which was developed under the European funded SEEWEC project, co-ordinated by Prof. Julien De Rouck of the Department of Coastal Engineering at Ghent University, Belgium. Besides the FlanSea project, DBE is involved in other initiatives. DBE is a founding member of Friends of the Supergrid, established in London on March 8, 2010, with the objective to develop a pan-European offshore super grid for renewable energy. DBE is also a partner and shareholder in Renewable Energy Base Oostende (REBO), founded on October 28, 2010, for servicing offshore wind farms in Northwest Europe.

==== Global Sea Mineral Resources (GSR) ====
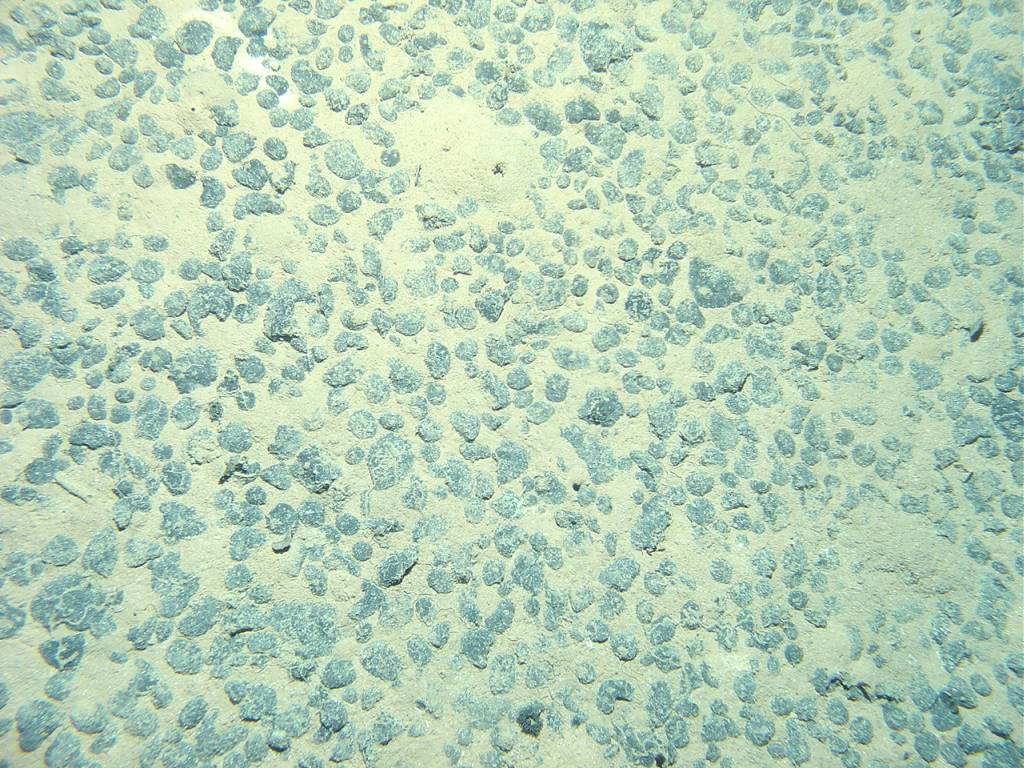
Manganese nodules on the deep seabed. They represent a potential resource in cobalt, nickel and copper.

DEME has founded a deep-sea exploration and exploitation subsidiary company for underwater mining of polymetallic nodules: Global Sea Mineral Resources (GSR). GSR works on the recovery of manganese nodules rich in cobalt, nickel and copper from the deep seabed. Exploitation of polymetallic nodules has been studied since the 1960s, but was not considered economically profitable until the early 2000s. Now that lower grade nickel ores must be exploited on land, underwater mining activities are a viable business, to be balanced with concern over the environmental destruction of the deep ocean.

In 2013, GSR and the International Seabed Authority (ISA) signed a 15-year contract for the prospection and exploration of polymetallic nodules. GSR acquired exploration rights over 75,000 square kilometers of the seabed in the eastern part of the Clarion Clipperton fracture zone (CCZ) of the Central Pacific Ocean. GSR and research institutions collect baseline data to assess the environmental impact of deep sea mining.

== Projects ==
Over the decades, DEME activities have significantly diversified. New businesses were developed such as soil remediation; silt recycling; offshore services for the oil and gas industry; fluvial & marine aggregates; installation of near- and farshore wind farms; marine salvage, wreck removal and heavy lifting; 'tidal' blue energy; and financial engineering. In 2009, capital and maintenance dredging represented 67 per cent of consolidated turnover. Assignments in European Union countries stood for 35 per cent of consolidated turnover, with 18 per cent in Africa and 13 per cent in Asia.

=== Historic realizations ===
For more than a century, DEME companies have been involved in capital and maintenance dredging in the maritime approaches to the Belgian coastal ports as well as the fairway between Vlissingen and Antwerp. Between 1894 and 1911, Ackermans & van Haaren dredged some 25 million m^{3} when deepening the Belgian and Dutch stretches of the Western Scheldt, a high volume given the technology available at the time. After the Second World War, DEME companies extended the port of Antwerp, both on the right bank of the Schelde during the major ten-year infrastructure programme (1956–1967) and on the left bank, for an entirely new port. In the Port of Antwerp DEME built the 500 × 68 m Berendrecht Lock, the largest lock in the world at the time, which was completed in 1989. In the 1970s and 80s, several DEME companies took the lead in building the outer port of Zeebrugge.

DEME companies have worked abroad too. Starting in 1903, Ackermans & van Haaren almost continuously executed infrastructure projects in Latin America. For ten years, the company worked on the port of Rosario (Santa Fe) in Argentina. In 1912, total volume handled at Rosario was estimated at 9.5 million m^{3} of dredging and 5.7 million m^{3} of reclamation. Other dredging works in Argentina in those years were executed at La Plata, Bahía Blanca, Puerto Belgrano, San Nicolas, Ensenada, Sorento, Quequén, the Paraná Delta, and the Matschwitz canal. From 1910 until 1913, Ackermans & van Haaren built a 1150 m long tunnel in Buenos Aires, supplying water from the Rio de la Plata. Other Latin American countries where Ackermans & van Haaren was active before the First World War include Uruguay, where the company built the port of Montevideo and carried out gravel dredging near Colón, and Brazil, where 8.5 million m^{3} were dredged in the port of Rio Grande do Sul between 1908 and 1916.

In the Russian city of Saint Petersburg, Ackermans & van Haaren built the military harbour, known as Emperor Peter the Great, between 1913 and 1917. In 1916, the company started construction of docks for the Russian navy at Sveaborg near Helsingfors (Helsinki), the capital of Finland. In the Interbellum, DEME companies built the new Baltic port of Gdynia for which a total of 36 million m^{3} was dredged in what Richardson calls "quite heroic circumstances". In the mid-1930s, DEME companies worked in the Persian port of Now-Chahr and in Phnom Penh, the capital of then- French protectorate of Cambodia, where Ackermans & van Haaren's flagship Antwerpen III was assigned for dredging the Mekong river.

Richardson claims "the maritime history of France may be written by way of the involvement of Ackermans & van Haaren in building and dredging its Atlantic and Mediterranean ports." DEME companies have been involved in all successive phases of the extension of the Port of Le Havre since 1904 – the latest phase being Le Havre Port 2000.

Another DEME operating company, Baggerwerken Decloedt & Zoon, has been dredging the maritime access channels to Belgian sea ports for over a century. Among the company's early assignments in Asia, three projects stand out: construction of the port of Bluff on New Zealand's South Island between October 1956 and October 1960 (in a joint-venture with another constituent company of DEME, Société Générale de Dragage/Algemene Baggermaarschappij); the very first reclamation in Malaysia's Port Klang; and the 1969–1970 extension of the first runway on Sydney Airport in Australia. In 1994, DEME also built the parallel runway there, which extends on reclaimed land in Botany Bay.

=== Orders in the 2000s ===
Driven by the constant need for new infrastructure, population growth, climate change, expanding maritime trade, further containerisation, and a dramatic increase of scale (both in navigation and port facilities), the demand for capital and maintenance dredging, land reclamation and port construction has generated demand for ocean engineering projects on an unsurpassed scale.

DEME continued maintenance dredging throughout the 2000s in the Schelde access channel to Antwerp; the North Sea access lanes to the Belgian sea ports; the Elbe river between Cuxhaven and Hamburg in Germany; the Orinoco river in Venezuela; and the mouths of the Niger Delta in Nigeria.

In France, DEME companies completed the Port 2000 extension project in the Port of Le Havre. The €218 million contract involved a total dredged volume of over 45 million m^{3}; construction of 10 km of breakwaters; and 78 ha of land reclamation. Marine works were executed in tides of up to 8 m and strong currents of up to 5 knots. On the Mediterranean coast of France, DEME finished the Fos2XL extension at Fos-sur-Mer. The €400 million contract was awarded by the Port of Marseille Authority (PMA) to a consortium of DEME-companies which carried out the dredging and marine works.

In Vuosaari, Finland, DEME dredged hard rock for the construction of a new container terminal. In Sepetiba and Itaguaí, both in Brazil, DEME's TSHD Breydel dredged the access channel and a basin for port extensions. In Dhamra in the state of Orissa on the eastern coast of India, DEME deepened a 19 km long access channel and reclaimed 130ha for a new port, assigning a water injection dredger. The €100 million contract in Dhamra was executed by International Seaport Dredging (ISD), in which DEME is partnered with the Indian company Larsen & Toubro. Since 2005, DEME has been active in four successive construction phases of the Russian port Ust-Luga at 120 km west of Saint Petersburg. Ust-Luga will be the final point of the Second Baltic Pipeline. On a visit at Ust-Luga in January 2006, Russian president Vladimir Putin declared that the new port was "extremely important for us. It is one of the largest infrastructure projects of the decade."

In the Gulf state of Qatar, DEME delivered the artificial island Pearl of the Gulf before the Asian Olympic Games in Doha under the lead of Hedwig Vanlishout, Roland Durie, and Jasper Verstreepen. The island, shaped like a seahorse, called for the excavation of approximately 18 million m^{3} of material, reclamation of an area of approximately 4.2 million m^{2}, around 180,000 m^{3} of concrete quay walls, and approximately 45 linear kilometers of rock revetment and sandy beaches. The residential and touristic development project takes into account the future sea level rise for one hundred years to come. Together with its partners United Development Company (UDC) and the Qatari government, DEME created a 22 km^{2} platform for the new Doha airport, which required 62 million m^{3} of sand and rock to be removed.

On 4 April 2008, the Panama Canal Authority (ACP) awarded the contract to dredge the Pacific sea entrance of the Panama Canal to DEME operating company Dredging International. The 177.5 million (USD) project widened the Canal's 14 km approach, access, and navigation channels to a minimum of 218m and deepened them to a maximum level of -15.5m. DEME removed a total of 9.07 million m^{3}. Dredging operations took place close to port activity at Baldoa and Rodman. A follow-on contract involved dredging and deepening at the Rodman quay of Panama International Terminal. For ACP's Fresh Water Dredging and Excavation Project for the Canal Expansion, Panama Canal Authority further awarded a US$40 million contract to DEME for widening and deepening the existing channel by dredging 4.6 million m^{3} in the northern reaches of Gatun Lake.

Offshore assignments by Tideway Offshore Contractors included trench dredging, construction of landfalls, and protection and stabilisation of the Enagás submarine Balearic gas pipeline (between the Spanish city of Denia and the Balearic Islands of Ibiza and Mallorca), where a depth record was achieved at -987m. Tideway had established an earlier depth record in 2000, at a depth of -780m at the Malampaya development project in the Philippines. With proprietary fall pipe vessels, Tideway was continuously involved in rock placement and protection works for the oil industry in North Sea oil projects. Media reported other assignments, such as the Encana Deep Panuke project in Nova Scotia, Canada, and the P9 project for the Pluto LNG project at Woodside, Australia. At the end of 2007, Tideway installed the 580 km HVDC submarine power cable known as NorNed, which links the electricity grids of Norway and the Netherlands.

DEME companies worked on construction of the first phase of C- Power's Thorntonbank Wind Farm, including offshore soil investigation, transport and placement of the gravity-based structures, erosion protection, cable-laying, and directional drilling. DEME-controlled Scaldis Salvage & Marine Contractors was involved in the successful wreck removal of the MV Tricolor car carrier, lost at sea off Dunkirk.

In the field of environmental remediation, DEC (in its home country Belgium) executed the remediation of acid tar basins for Total in Ertvelde; the remediation of the former Carcoke Coking Works site in Zeebrugge; and the remediation and redevelopment of the 42ha brownfield 't Eilandje in Zwijnaarde. Abroad, DEC was involved in remediation works at the cyanide-contaminated former Gas Works site in Dublin Dockland, Ireland; at the Avenue Coking Works site near Chesterfield, UK; and the decontamination of the London Olympics 2012 site in Stratford. In the 2000s, DEC was active in Sweden, cleaning the mercury contamination in the Svartsjö lakes near Hultsfred; removing mercury and dioxins from a site in Bengtsfors; and further in Favernik, Söderhamn and Gävle.

=== Orders in 2010 ===
On 16 March 2010 DEME started major dredging works for DP World's London Gateway, the UK's new deep sea port and logistics park at 25 miles east of Central London on the river Thames. DEME is dredging a 300m wide channel to a depth between 14.6m and 16.5m while the estuary is currently around 11m deep. Over a distance of 100 km to the sea some 29 million m^{3} will be dredged; in addition DEME is reclaiming 18 million m^{3} in the Thames. The 400 million pound contract must be finished by mid-2014. For the civilian works, DEME partnered with British contractor Laing O'Rourke.

On 31 March 2010, DEME completed the widening and deepening works in the port of Durban, South Africa that began in mid-2007. The existing northern breakwater was demolished and rebuilt; the existing southern breakwater was strengthened; the port entrance channel was widened from 120m to 220m; and deepened from 12.8m to 19m in the outer channel and 17m in the inner port. A total of more than 10 million m^{3} of material was dredged, part of which was used for the foundation and reinforcement of the breakwaters. Apart from the mega-dipper Pinocchio and two split barges, DEME assigned the trailing suction hopper dredgers Marieke, Krankeloon, Orwell and Pallieter to the €220 million project. DEME was the managing partner in a consortium that included South African civilian contractor Group Five.

In the Middle East, DEME is executing the dredging and reclamation package for the Ruwais Refinery Expansion project of Takreer in Abu Dhabi. The work was awarded to Dredging International in May 2009 and started on 7 June 2009. A total of 42 million m^{3} is being dredged, pumped and reclaimed by heavy-duty cutter suction dredger Al Mahar and trailing suction hopper dredgers.

In Latin America DEME is active in a major remediation project in the Port of Santos, Brazil. The €75 million turnkey project calls for the remediation of the illegal dump site Lixao da Alemoa at the edge of a bay. A total of 680.000 m^{3} of domestic waste and industrial waste are being processed on an area covering 45 ha, where Brasil Terminal Portuario is building a container terminal. Most of this waste will be recycled and reused; a fraction, between 10.000 and 50.000 m^{3}, will have to be stored. DEME executes this contract through its subsidiary DEC, which also arranged project financing. The Santos contract was said to be "a breakthrough for DEME in Latin America." During a mission to Brazil, Belgian crown prince Prince Philippe, Duke of Brabant visited the DEC turnkey project in Santos.

Together with its partner Larsen & Toubro in International Seaport Dredging (ISD), DEME finished a 10 km access channel, turning basin, and berthing foreground in the Indian port of Kakinada, state of Andhra Pradesh, in 2010. Dredging a total of 6 million m^{3} deepened the sea port from -11.5m to between -13.5 and -14.5m. A second contract for dredging another 5 million m^{3} was to be completed by March 2011. Since 1999 DEME has already executed several capital dredging campaigns at Kakinada, both directly. and through ISD.

On 18 August 2010, DEME was awarded a €105 million contract for dredging and reclamation works to prepare the Imeretinskaya lowland area at Sochi, Russia, where the Olympic Village for the 2014 Olympic Winter Games will be built. In an execution period of maximum 14 months, a total of 8 million m^{3} sand must be dredged and transported over a distance of 120 km to reclaim a 412ha swamp area to 2.5m above the Black Sea zero level. DEME has assigned its TSHDs Brabo and Nile River to the Sochi project.

In Hayle, off the coast of Cornwall, UK, DEME subsidiary Tideway was involved in precision rock placement for protection of the wave hub and a 16 km power cable, linking the tidal energy park with land. Tideway's fall pipe vessel Rollingstone placed some 100.000 tons at a depth between 25m and 35m by way of digital terrain modelling and a remotely operated vehicle (ROV).

== Investment programme ==
Between 2002 and 2007, ten major dredgers were added to the DEME fleet. This included the world's largest heavy-duty seagoing cutter suction dredger, the 28,000 kW d'Artagnan. With the construction of Pearl River in 1994, DEME became notable in the industry for operating "the first 'jumbo' trailer suction dredger." On 1 August 2002, the enlargement of Pearl River was started in Singapore. In the process, the hopper capacity of Pearl River increased from 17,000 m^{3} to 24,146 m^{3}. A deep dredging installation for the Pearl River was built in, which allows the jumbo trailer to dredge to depths of 120 m.

A further fleet investment is scheduled to take place in the late 2010s, beginning with dredgers Minerva and Scheldt River, which were delivered in 2017, followed by Spartacus, the largest and most powerful cutter suction dredger in the world in 2019, and two trailing suction hopper dredgers and two split barges in 2020.

== Innovation ==
According to Mort J. Richardson in The Dynamics of Dredging Ackermans & van Haaren has long held a leading position in technological innovation within the field. In 1895 Ackermans & van Haaren helped create hydraulic dredging techniques and designed a suction dredger capable of unloading by itself. In the same year, the first such vessel was built, Schelde II. Société Générale de Dragage/Algemene Baggermaatschappij (SGD) applied the first submersible pump in dredging, fixed on the drag head of TSHD Maas. At the time of her commissioning in September 1994, DEME's 17,000 m^{3} flagship Pearl River became, according to Richardson, "the very first suction hopper dredge of a completely new generation – featuring twice as much capacity as its biggest successor." In 2005 DEME's French subsidiary Société de Dragage International (SDI) launched the world's largest heavy-duty and ocean-going cutter suction dredger d'Artagnan (28,200 kW installed power).

DEME's proprietary DRACULA technique uses high-pressure waterjets to excavate seabed material. DRACULA is an acronym for "Dredging, And Cutting Using Liquid Action". Various improvements of navigation and dredging software have led DEME to develop and practise the one man-operated bridge. A purpose-built drill barge with ten drilling towers, Yuan Dong 007, was designed and constructed for the 2009 expansion project of the Panama Canal. The performance and efficiency of the Hong Kong-built drill barge was a decisive factor in winning the 2008 contract for improving the Pacific side of the Canal.

== Shareholders ==
As of December 2025, the shareholding structure of the group is:

Shareholder	Interest
Ackermans & van Haaren NV	62.12%
VINCI Construction SAS	12.11%
Treasury shares	0.34%
Other investors	25.43%
