= TSHD Congo River =

2011 Dredging ship

Trailing Suction Hopper Dredger Congo River is the newest ship of the DEME fleet with the biggest hopper capacity: 30,190 m^{3}. DEME N.V. signed a contract with IHC Dredgers B.V. for the design, construction, and delivery of the ship.

== Launching ==
The contract between DEME N.V. and IHC Dredgers B.V. was signed in December 2008. On 15 December 2009 the keel was laid, and on 8 July 2011 the ship was named during a formal ceremony in Zeebrugge.

=== Christening ===
Justine Henin, the olympic tennis champion, has been designated to be the godmother of the Congo River. The christening took place on 8 July 2011 in Zeebrugge.

== Main characteristics ==
The main characteristics of the Congo River, construction year 2011.

Overall length	168.00m
Width	38.00
Depth	13.30
Draught	12.15
Hopper capacity	30,190m^{3}
Loading capacity	48,000t
Speed	16.60kn
Dredging depth maximum	36.00 / 56.00m

The hopper can be equipped with the Dracula system with a power of 27,677 kW. The Dracula system is used for the dredging of cemented sand with an UCS-value of 5 to 8 MPas.

== New contract ==
The Congo River has been assigned to the Eko Atlantic city project in Nigeria.
