= Spartacus (ship) =

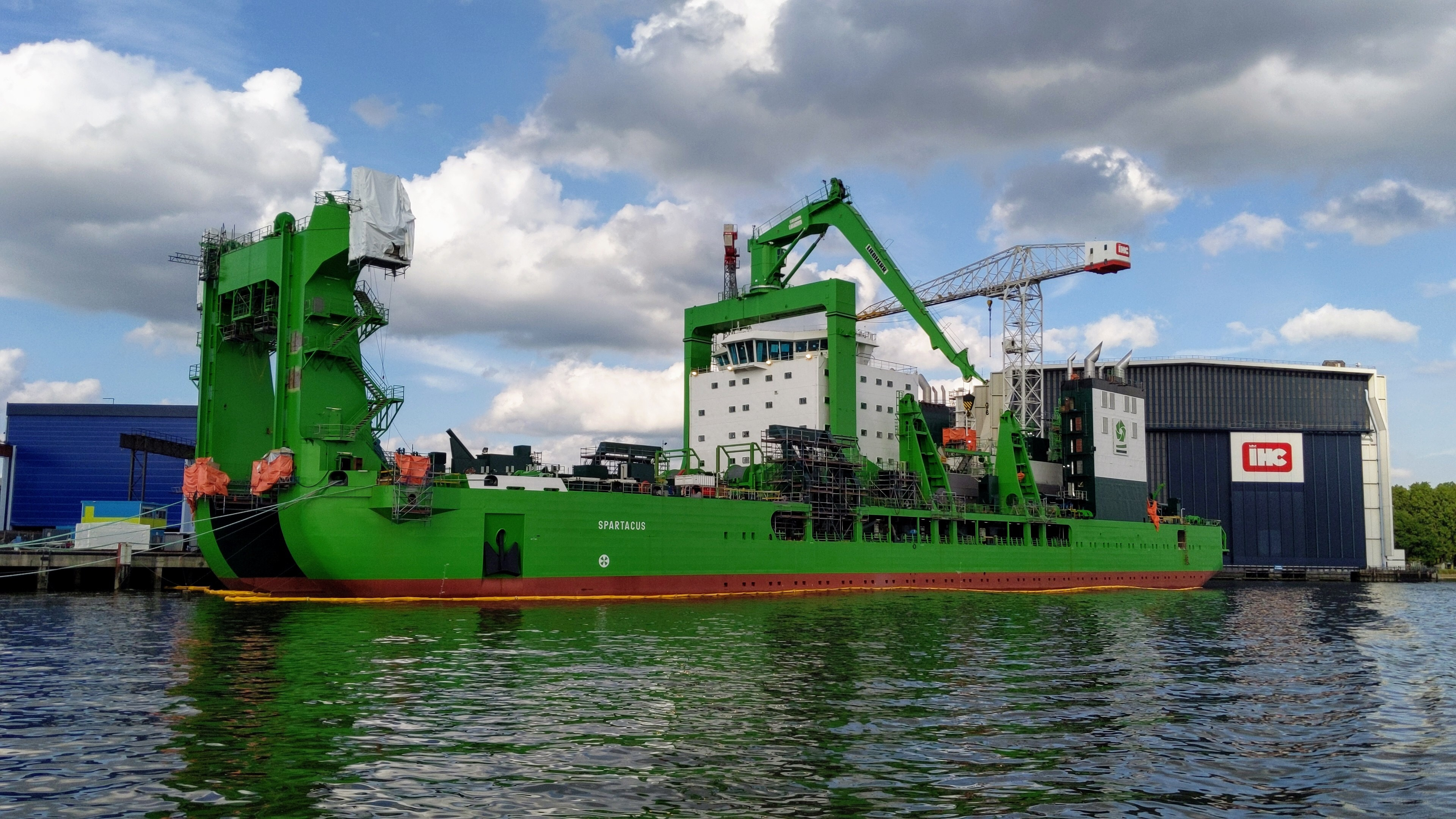
- Spartacus at Royal IHC, Rotterdam

Spartacus is a cutter suction dredger (CSD) that entered service in August 2021 for DEME. She is the largest and most powerful ship of her type in the world.

DEME ordered Spartacus in March 2017 from Dutch shipbuilder Royal IHC to a design jointly developed by DEME, Royal IHC, and Vuyk Engineering Rotterdam, a Royal IHC subsidiary. Her keel was laid in December at Royal IHC's shipyard in Krimpen aan den IJssel, and she was launched in November 2018. She entered service in August 2021.

Spartacus measures 164 metres (538 ft) long and has a total power output of 44,180 kilowatts (59,250 hp), making her the world's largest and most powerful CSD. She is powered by four Wärtsilä 46DF and two Wärtsilä 20DF engines, which can operate on liquefied natural gas, diesel fuel, or heavy fuel oil; she is the first CSD to be LNG-fuel capable. She can dredge at depths of up to 45 metres (148 ft), 10 metres (33 ft) deeper than any previous CSD design.
