= Ackermans & van Haaren =

Belgian holding company

Ackermans & van Haaren N.V.
- Type: Naamloze vennootschap
- Traded as: Euronext Brussels: ACKB; BEL 20 component
- ISIN: BE0003764785
- Industry: Conglomerate holding company
- Founded: 1876; 150 years ago
- Headquarters: Antwerp, Belgium,
- Key people: John-Eric Bertrand (co-CEO); Piet Dejonghe (co-CEO)
- Products: Marine Engineering; Private Banking; Real Estate; Energy; Growth capital
- Revenue: 6,020 million euros (2021)
- Net income: 407 million euros (2021)
- Number of employees: 22,653 (average, 2021)
- Website: avh.be

Ackermans & van Haaren (often abbreviated as AvH) is a diversified group active in: Marine Engineering & Contracting (DEME, one of the largest dredging companies in the world - CFE, a construction group with headquarters in Belgium), Private Banking (Delen Private Bank, one of the largest independent private asset managers in Belgium, and asset manager JM Finn in the UK - Bank Van Breda, niche bank for entrepreneurs and the liberal professions in Belgium), Real estate (Nextensa, a listed integrated real estate group), Energy & Resources (SIPEF, an agroindustrial group in tropical agriculture), and Growth Capital.

The group focuses on a limited number of strategic participations with a significant potential for growth. AvH is listed on Euronext Brussels and is included in the BEL20 index and the European DJ Stoxx 600 index.

== History ==
The company was founded in 1880 as a dredging company. Although Ackermans & van Haaren is now a holding company, it is still active in the dredging sector through its subsidiary DEME.
