= Santa Cruz, Rio de Janeiro =

Santa Cruz
- Neighborhood
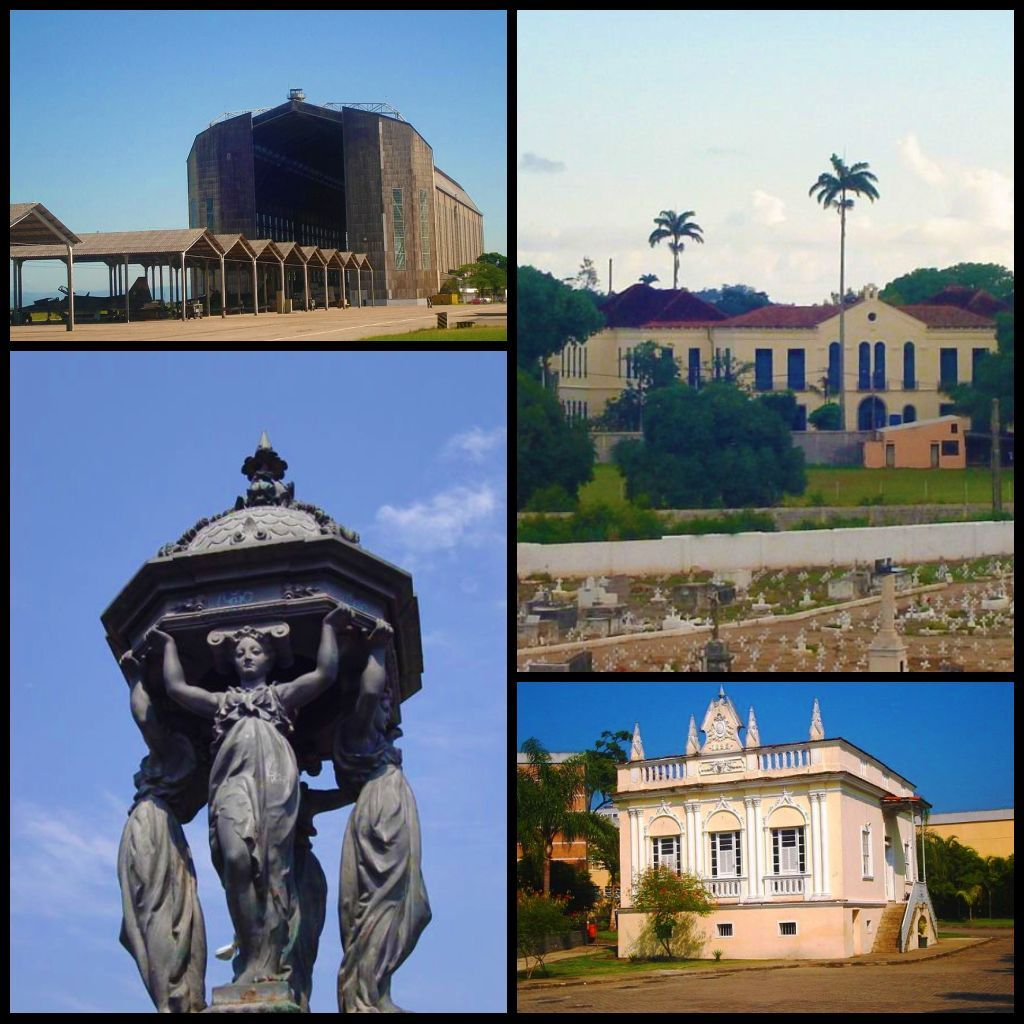
- Clockwise: South door Hangar do Zeppelin; Princess Isabel Palace; Araujo's Mansion, Wallace Fountain

- Coordinates: 22°55′13″S 43°41′06″W
- Country: Brazil
- State: Rio de Janeiro
- Municipality: Rio de Janeiro
- Neighborhood: West Zone
- Administrative Region: Santa Cruz

Area
  - Total: 12,504.43 ha (30,899.1 acres)

Population (2010)
  - Total: 217,333
  - Density: 1,738.05/km^{2} (4,501.52/sq mi)

Santa Cruz ('Holy Cross') is an extensive and populous neighborhood of the high class, lower middle and low in the West Zone of the municipality of Rio de Janeiro, Brazil, the farthest from the center of Rio de Janeiro. Cut by the Santa Cruz extension of the urban passenger rail network of the metropolitan region of Rio de Janeiro, it has a very diverse landscape, with commercial areas, residential and industrial.

The neighborhood of Santa Cruz is the seat of the administrative region of Santa Cruz, comprising the neighborhoods of Santa Cruz, Paciência and Sepetiba. The administrative region, in turn, belongs to the West Zone subprefecture.

Since the installation of Itaguaí Port, is a rapidly developing neighborhood. It is 445 years old, and has important preserved monuments. But it is a place of contrasts. It is one of the most populated districts, and at the same time, due to its vast land area, one of the least densely populated; has an industrial district, but in its landscape still rules many unexplored areas.

Its HDI in 2000 was 0.742, the 119 placed in the municipality of Rio de Janeiro, among 126 areas analyzed.

== Etymology ==
As stated in the rare work History of the Imperial Farm of Santa Cruz, published by Brazilian Historical and Geographical Institute, by Jose de Saldanha da Gama, who was one of the overseers of the farm in 1860, the Jesuits placed a large wooden cross, painted in black, seated on a stone base supported by a granite pillar. The cross gave his name to Santa Cruz on December 30, 1567.

During the Brazilian Empire, the cross was replaced by another of smaller dimensions. The cross that is now there is a replica built by the Brazilian Army.

== History ==
=== Background ===
Before the arrival of Europeans in America, the region known today as Santa Cruz was populated by people of the village's language family, Tupi–Guarani, who called the place of Spawning (fish too).

After the discovery of Brazil, with the arrival of Portuguese colonists to the Guanabara Bay, a vast area of lowlands of Santa Cruz and the surrounding mountains, was donated to Cristóvão Monteiro, the Captaincy of São Vicente by Martim Afonso de Sousa in January 1567, as a reward for services rendered during the military expedition that finally drove the French out of Guanabara. So he built shortly after a sugar mill and a chapel in a location known as Curral Falso, beginning the settlement of land by the Portuguese.

=== Companhia de Jesus ===
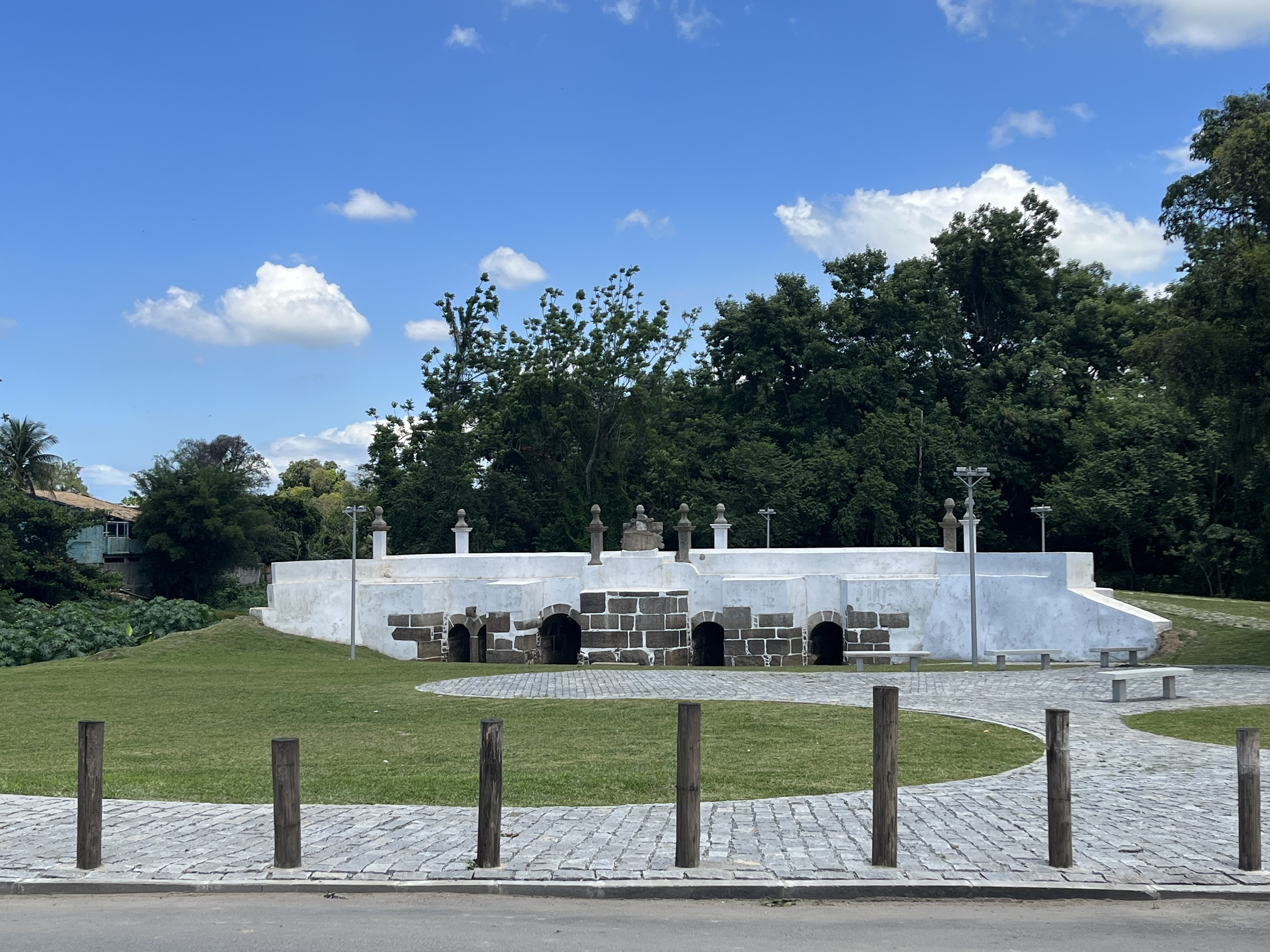
A Ponte dos Jesuítas.

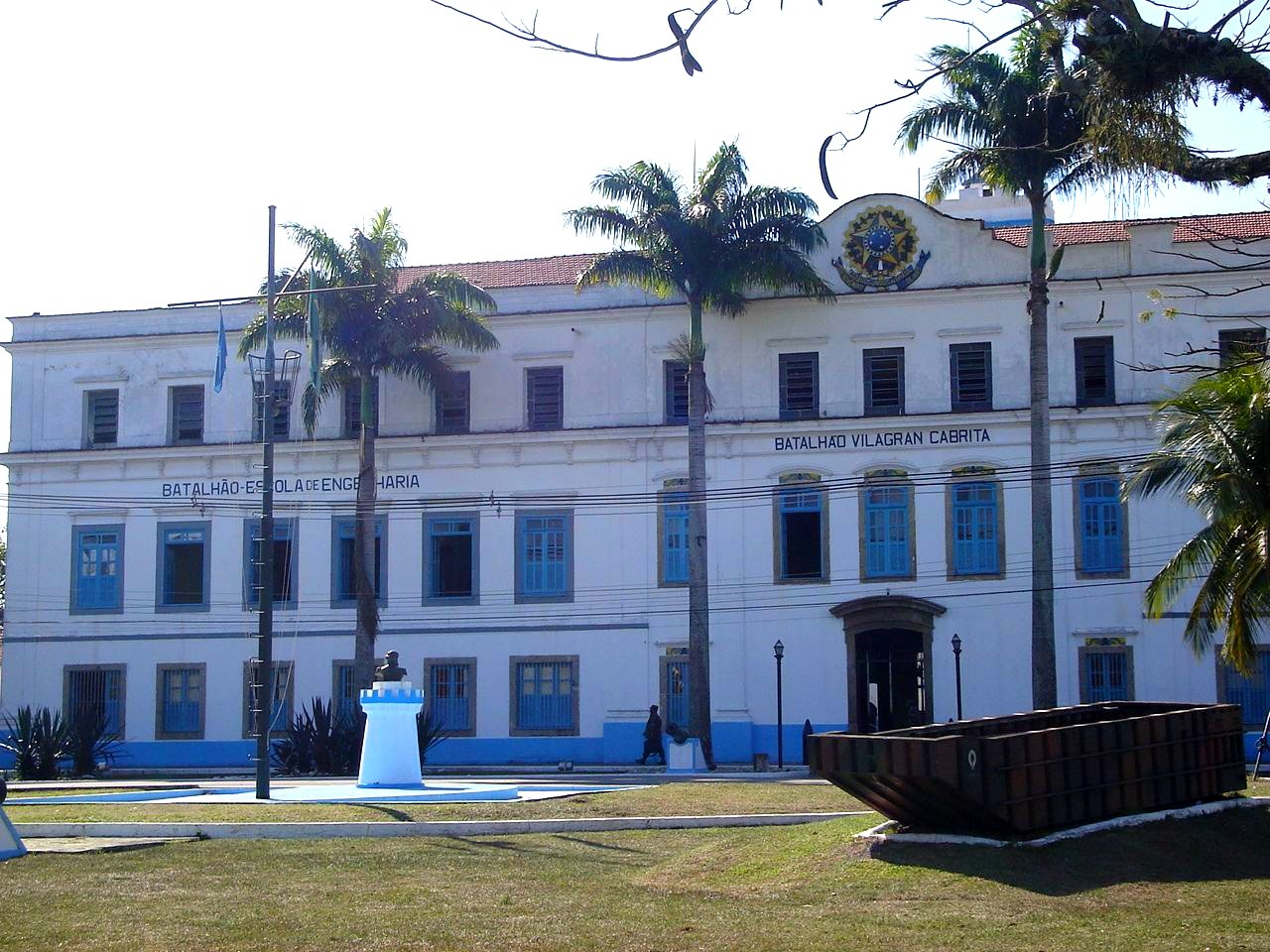
Headquarters of the Old Farm of the Royal and Imperial Santa Cruz Palace.

With the death of the owner of the land, his wife, Mrs. Marquesa Ferreira, donated to the priests of the Companhia de Jesus a part of the lands of Cristóvão played it.

These religious, by gathering these lands to other land grants, were an immense plantation marked by a large wooden cross: the Holy Cross. In a few decades, the region between Barra de Guaratiba, the current city of Mangaratiba, to Vassouras, in the south of the current state of Rio de Janeiro, was part of the powerful Finance from Santa Cruz, the most developed of the Captaincy of Rio de Janeiro this time with thousands of slaves, livestock, and various types of crops, managed with advanced techniques for the season.

Among the buildings today with historic value include churches and a convent, both richly decorated. One of these surviving works is called the Guandu Bridge or Bridge of the Jesuits. In fact a bridge-dam, which was erected in 1752, in order to adjust the volume of flood waters from the Guandu River. Currently, this monument remains with its original structure almost unchanged, with a heritage, artistic and architectural tumbled by IPHAN.

Another initiative of the leaders of Santa Cruz Farm, in terms of culture, was the foundation of a music school, an orchestra and choir, built by slaves, who played and sang at mass and in festivities, either on the farm or in the capital of the Captaincy. It is, therefore, that Santa Cruz was the birthplace of the organization's first instrumental and choral music conservatory in Brazil.

Passes through the cow lands of Santa Cruz in the trail that linked the colonial city of Sao Sebastiao do Rio de Janeiro to the interior: the Way of the Jesuits, later called The Way of Mines, and later still, the Royal Road to Santa Cruz. His route lay to the port of Sepetiba, where he embarked to the city of Paraty, where the former was leaving the Royal Road.

Before the expulsion of the Jesuits of the areas of Portugal and its colonies in 1759 by action of the Marquês de Pombal, the assets of the Companhia de Jesus (Finance and Santa Cruz) reverted to the Crown.

=== The Royal Family ===
With the banishment of the Jesuits in Brazil, the assets of Farm Santa Cruz went on to make the Viceroys. After a period of administrative difficulties, under the government of Viceroy Luís de Vasconcelos e Sousa, the farm again experienced a period of prosperity. At the beginning of the 19th century with the arrival of the Royal Family in Brazil (1808) and its establishment in Rio de Janeiro, the farm was chosen as a vacation spot. Thus, the former convent has been adapted to the functions of space real - Royal Palace of Santa Cruz.

Feeling comfortable in the Royal Treasury of Santa Cruz, the Prince Regent prolonged his stay for several months, shipping, promoting public hearings and approvals from the same. It grew up and were educated princes Don Pedro and Dom Miguel.

On the initiative of the Portuguese sovereign were brought from China about a hundred men in charge of cultivating tea, the site now known as Morro do Chá. For almost a century this activity has been productive and attracted the interest of technical and visitors, as the pioneer its implementation in Brazil. The tea harvested in Santa Cruz was excellent and, therefore, its production was fully sold. On July 15 of 1818 was founded the village of São Francisco Xavier de Itaguaí, which Santa Cruz becomes an end. João VI said goodbye to Santa Cruz in 1820, to return to the metropolis.

=== The First Reign ===
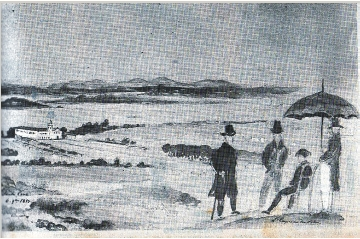
Emperor in the gazebo, watching the scenery of Finance of Santa Cruz.

After the return of João VI of Portugal, the Prince Regent, Dom Pedro, continued constantly present in Santa Cruz, passing his honeymoon with the Empress Leopoldina (1818) on this farm, transforming the Royal Palace in the Imperial Palace.

In the context of the Independence of Brazil, before starting the historic voyage of Independence, the Prince Regent stopped in Santa Cruz, where there was a meeting on August 15 of 1822, with the presence of José Bonifácio, to establish their bases. Upon his return, before heading to the city, celebrated the independence of Brazil on the farm.

=== The Second Reign ===
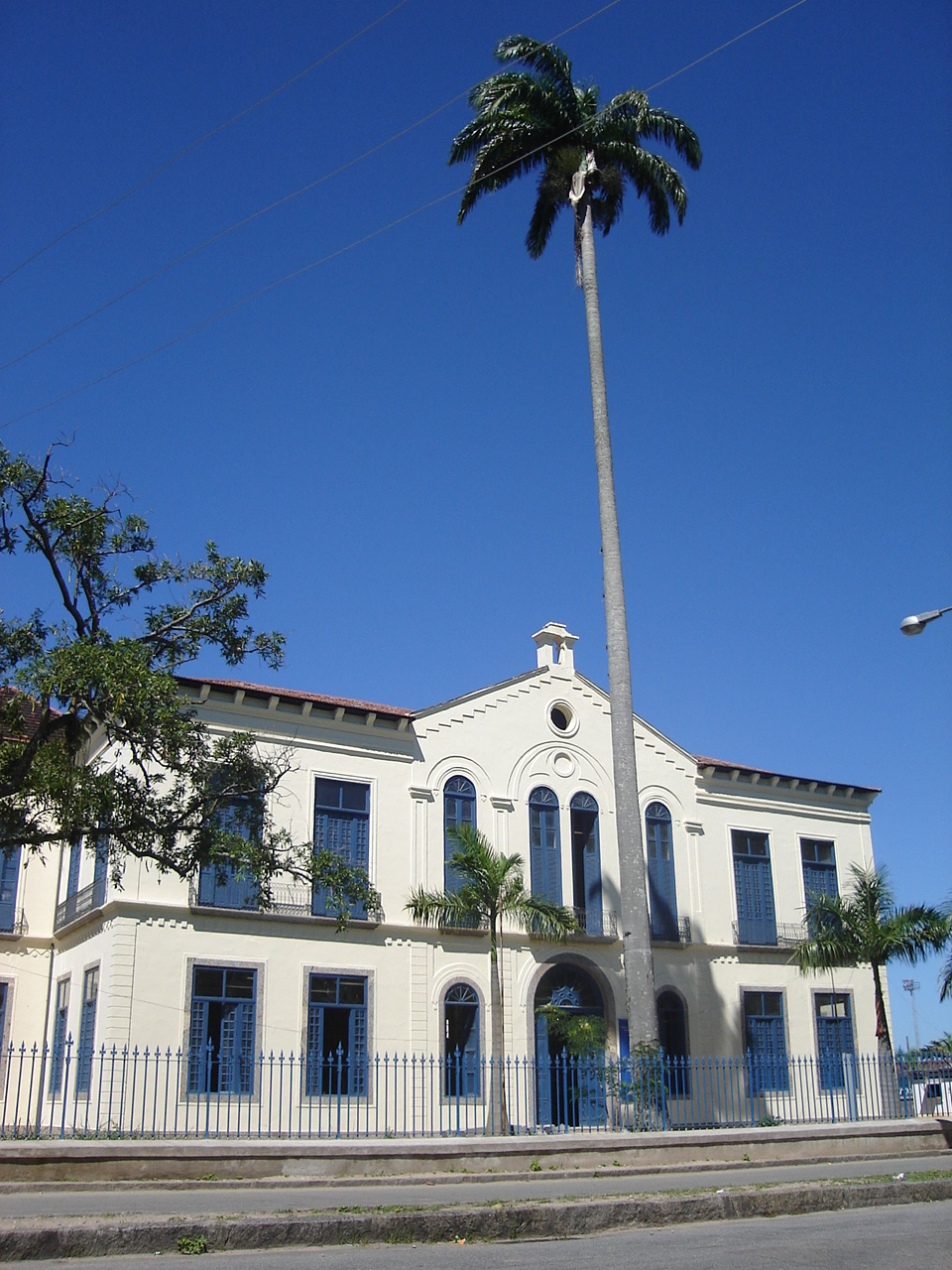
Princess Isabel's Palace

Dom Pedro I, abdicated the throne, but his sons continued to maintain a constant presence in the Imperial Treasury of Santa Cruz. Early on, Dom Pedro II and promoted the princesses crowded balls and soirees at the Imperial Palace.

It should also be noted that throughout the period between 1808 and 1889, Santa Cruz was one of the city of Rio with its landscapes portrayed by foreign travelers as the French Jean-Baptiste Debret, the Austrian Thomas Ender, the English Mary Graham and others. The picture that serves as the illustration for this text is an example, being written by the Belgian painter Benjamin Mary, who was the first ambassador of Belgium in Brazil, painted in November 1837. The figure is documentary evidence that the viewpoint of Santa Cruz was a visiting place for the emperors, in which you can see beyond the old Imperial Palace, Dom Pedro II with only 14 years old enjoying the view from the farm.

In the year 1833 the parsonage National Treasury of Santa Cruz has been shut down by decree the end of the village of Itaguaí and became the end of the city of Rio de Janeiro, taking into account the wishes of local people.

In Santa Cruz the law was signed by Princess Isabel who gave emancipation to all slaves of the Imperial Government. The enactment of the law was attended by distinguished guests such as the Viscount of Rio Branco and the Conde d'Eu.

Santa Cruz, a political-economic position, and especially strategic (facing the sea and back into the paths of the backlands of Minas) was one of the first places in the country to benefit from the system of home delivery of letters by mail. On November 22 of 1842 opened the first branch of the Post Office in Brazil to adopt this service. It was also the site chosen by the emperor to install the first telephone line from South America, between the Palace of São Cristóvão and Santa Cruz.

In 1878 was inaugurated the train station and at the end of 1881, D. Pedro II inaugurated the Slaughterhouse Santa Cruz, known as the most modern in the world at the time, which was served by an extension of the railroad and supplied meat the whole city of Rio de Janeiro. Also, due to the generator which served the slaughter, Santa Cruz was the first district of the suburb to have electric lighting. D. Pedro II also launched the first phone of Finance.

Gradually, Santa Cruz was transformed, with palaces, solar, shops, streets and parks. Weathering the weather and the criminal actions of men, many of these places are still standing, attesting to the importance of this historic neighborhood. The Palace Princess Isabel, the Marco Onze, the Wallace Fountain, The Zeppelin Hangar and many others, are examples.

=== Republic ===
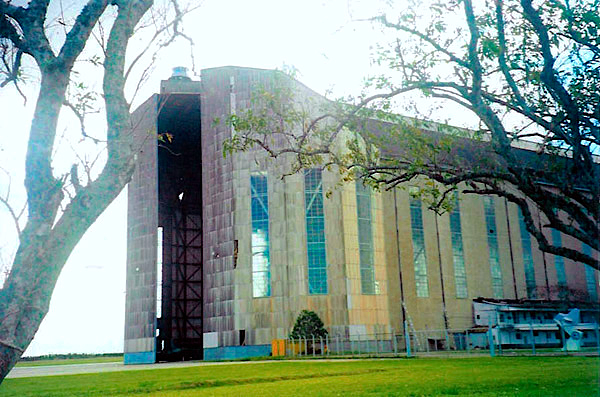
Santa Cruz AFB Hangar's South Door. This is one of the world's last standing hangars built for zeppelins.

After the Proclamation of the Republic, Santa Cruz lost much of its prestige. But solved some problems, soon attracted foreign immigrants, who contributed greatly to the economy of the neighborhood. The Arabs and the Italians were responsible for the expansion of local commerce, and the development of Japanese agriculture.

During the government Getúlio Vargas in the 1930s, the region of Santa Cruz has undergone profound changes, with sanitation projects that aimed for recovery of land, with the recovery of health and economic dynamism, from the creation of agricultural colonies. In 1938 came the first Japanese families, not directly from Japan, but of Mogi das Cruzes, São Paulo, to fill the newly created lots Colonial Center and implement new experiences in agriculture. The lots were distributed through the streets of Reta do Rio Grande and Reta de Sao Fernando, and they, when they came, immediately put his hands on the land, having already produced that year after only three months of work, significant amount of food. The production was so great that supplied the whole city of Rio de Janeiro, giving Santa Cruz the title "breadbasket" of the Federal District.

At the time was still built in the region, a hangar for dirigible Zeppelin, the Zeppelin Hangar. The building is listed by the Institute for National Artistic and Historical Heritage (IPHAN) since 1998, receiving the subscription tipping No. 550.

With the intensive development of Rio de Janeiro, occurring in all directions, was inaugurated in 1975, the Industrial Zone, strongly promoting the urbanization of the neighborhood. In it are located the three major industrial districts: Santa Cruz, Paciência and Palmares, where they are in full operation at the Casa da Moeda do Brasil, Cosigua (Gerdau Group), Valesul, White Martins, Glasurit and to Usina Santa Cruz, one of the largest thermoelectric fuel oil from Latin America, with an installed capacity of 950 MW.

In the early 1980s, many housing projects were built by the State Housing Company (CEHAB) which increased the population of the neighborhood, giving it the characteristics of the neighborhood dorm.

=== Current ===
Santa Cruz has experienced significant urban growth and has a commercial sector that includes banks and a variety of retail businesses. The district is served by schools and by the Dom Pedro II Municipal Hospital, which has been modernized and includes facilities for the treatment of burn injuries.

It is also home to two major Armed Forces installations: the School of Engineering Battalion and Santa Cruz Air Base, an important Brazilian Air Force facility. Other local institutions and attractions include Cidade das Crianças Brizola, a municipal theme park aimed primarily at children and adolescents, as well as several historical and cultural monuments.

Were installed, particularly near the avenida João XXIII, several industrial enterprises weight, especially the Companhia Siderúrgica do Atlântico (CSA), which changed the landscape and dynamism to the economy of the district. It is scheduled for put into operation a factory turbo-power generators for offshore platforms by the end of 2012, an investment of US$60 million of British Rolls-Royce Energy. Until 2016 will be installed in an area of 570,000 m^{2} in the industrial district the new processing center vaccines and biopharmaceuticals of Fiocruz, which will invest R$ 800 million, which will be manufactured 600 million doses of vaccine per year. It is scheduled to visit Pope Benedict XVI during the World Youth Day 2013.

It is also characterized as a working-class neighborhood, in which there are many problems such as transportation difficulties, lack of sanitation appropriate at certain points, action of militias in poor communities and environmental problems serious.

With increasing population, the violence in the neighborhood has worried the authorities. The police action is to combat the trafficking of narcotics in the slums surrounding the neighborhood, as well as militiamen in action. These are responsible for the control of alternative transportation, and illegal operation of electricity, gas and cable television .

== Geography ==
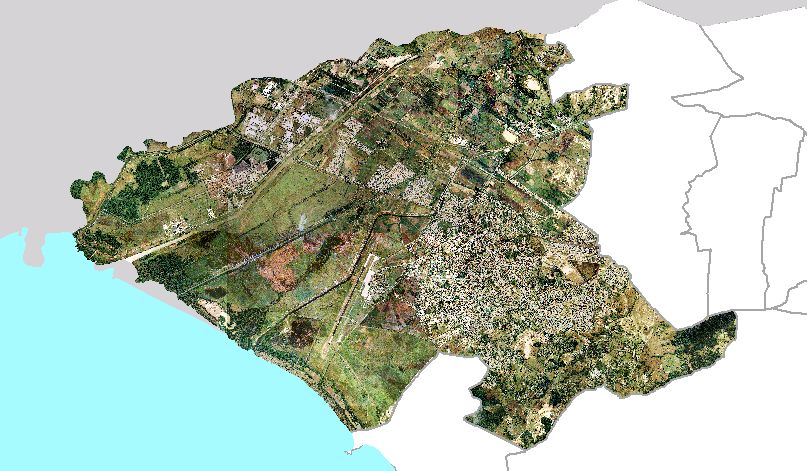
Satellite image of the administrative region of Santa Cruz (where is located the neighborhood of Santa Cruz).

Located at latitude 22 ° 55 '13 "S, 43 ° 41' 6" in the extreme west of the municipality, its territory extends over an area of 12,504.43 ha and is the neighboring municipalities of Itaguaí west and Seropédica the north, the neighborhoods of Sepetiba south, Patience and Cosmos in the east and Guaratiba southeast. The Southwest territory is bathed in Sepetiba Bay.

=== Relief and hydrography ===
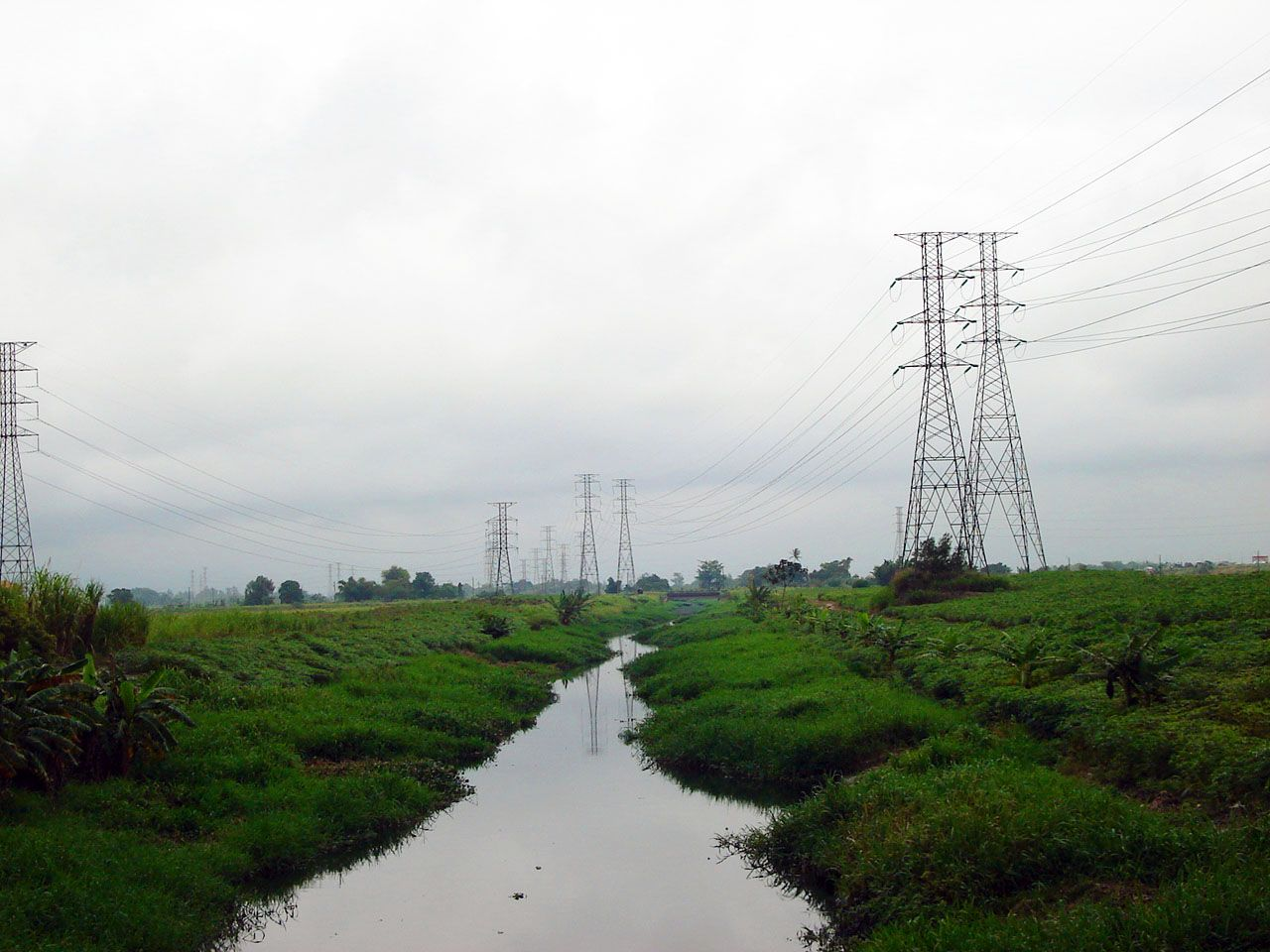
One of the rivers that cut through the neighborhood

For lying in the valley of Santa Cruz, most of the country is flat, with altitudes near sea level, dominated barren areas such as Campo do Itongo, Campo Sapicu, Campo de São Luís, Campo de Roma e others. The exception is the center which is in an area a little bumpy, whose highest point is the Morro do Mirante with about 65 meters. Still stand out in the landscape of Morro da Bandeira, Morro da Joaquina and Morro do Leme with about 94 meters.

Its coastline, just cut, is bathed in the Sepetiba Bay for just over 10 km.

The lowlands of Santa Cruz is drained by several rivers and canals, among the principal are: the Rio da Guarda, the western limit of the municipality of Rio de Janeiro, rio Cação Vermelho, rio Guandu (canal de São Francisco), rio Guandu-Mirim Canal do Ita. All belonging to the basin of Sepetiba Bay. The canal of São Francisco serves to supply the industrial district. Since the channel of the Canal da Irrigação and the São Fernando irrigate crops in the Colonial Center.

=== Climate ===
The climate is classified as tropical savanna (Aw), according to the Köppen climate classification. The annual temperature average is about 25 °C (77 °F) and the average annual rainfall reaches 1040 mm.

Because it is a town near the coast, the effect of maritime moderation is quite noticeable, resulting in small diurnal and annual temperature variations.

Climate data for Rio de Janeiro (station of Santa Cruz, 1981—2010)
Month	Jan	Feb	Mar	Apr	May	Jun	Jul	Aug	Sep	Oct	Nov	Dec	Year
Record high °C (°F)	42.5 (108.5)	41.5 (106.7)	40.1 (104.2)	38.5 (101.3)	36.0 (96.8)	35.2 (95.4)	36.0 (96.8)	39.1 (102.4)	41.2 (106.2)	41.2 (106.2)	40.5 (104.9)	43.2 (109.8)	43.2 (109.8)
Mean daily maximum °C (°F)	32.7 (90.9)	33.6 (92.5)	32.3 (90.1)	30.8 (87.4)	28.2 (82.8)	27.6 (81.7)	26.7 (80.1)	27.7 (81.9)	27.4 (81.3)	28.7 (83.7)	30.0 (86.0)	31.2 (88.2)	29.7 (85.5)
Mean daily minimum °C (°F)	22.9 (73.2)	23.1 (73.6)	22.6 (72.7)	21.4 (70.5)	19.1 (66.4)	18.0 (64.4)	17.3 (63.1)	17.8 (64.0)	18.5 (65.3)	19.7 (67.5)	20.9 (69.6)	22.0 (71.6)	20.3 (68.5)
Record low °C (°F)	16.9 (62.4)	17.8 (64.0)	16.4 (61.5)	13.2 (55.8)	12.0 (53.6)	9.0 (48.2)	9.7 (49.5)	11.6 (52.9)	11.3 (52.3)	13.3 (55.9)	14.6 (58.3)	16.1 (61.0)	9.0 (48.2)
Average precipitation mm (inches)	143.8 (5.66)	100.1 (3.94)	110.6 (4.35)	101.3 (3.99)	67.7 (2.67)	48.0 (1.89)	52.2 (2.06)	36.7 (1.44)	71.4 (2.81)	76.7 (3.02)	92.8 (3.65)	138.9 (5.47)	1,040.2 (40.95)
Average precipitation days (≥ 1.0 mm)	11	8	9	7	7	5	6	6	8	8	9	11	95
Source: Instituto Nacional de Meteorologia — INMET (climatic average of 1981-2010; temperature records of 1963-01-01 to 1994-10-16 and 1998-05-04 to present)

=== Vegetation ===
According to the 2000 Census conducted by the IBGE, 4.18% of the natural area of Santa Cruz is covered by mangroves, forest changed by 3.66%, 1.63% by vegetation of wetlands as swamps and marshes and 0.66% by forests.

=== Demographics ===
According to an estimate of the Brazilian Institute of Geography and Statistics, 2010 Census data, Santa Cruz has a total population of 217,333 inhabitants. Of these, 112,966 residents are female and 104,367 residents are male. Data also include a total of 76,295 households. The average household nominal income is R$1,579.00, which puts the district on 140th position among 160 districts of the municipality of Rio de Janeiro surveyed.

=== Religion ===
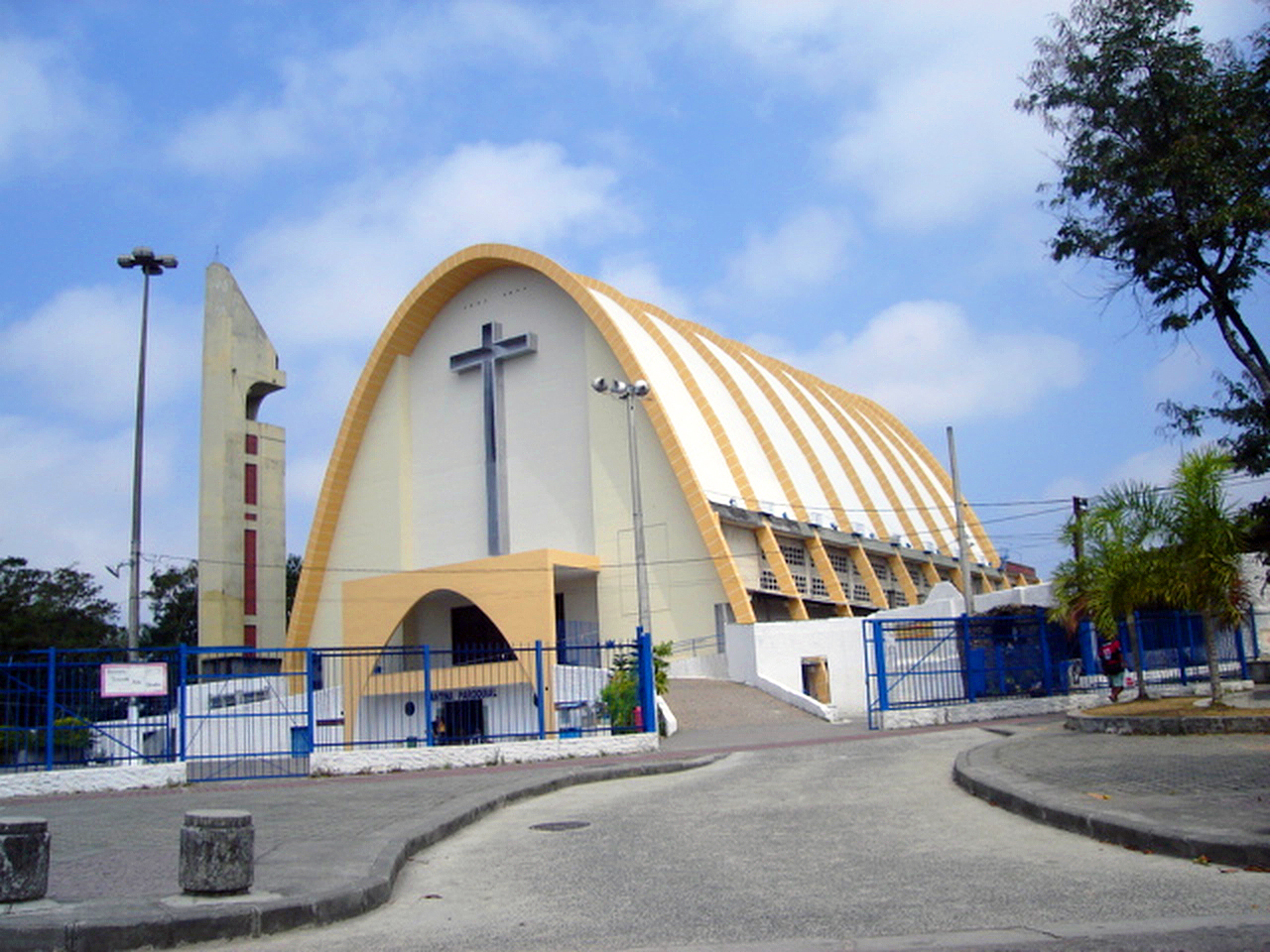
Nossa Senhora da Conceição Church is the second largest church in Rio de Janeiro

The microdata from the Census 2000, the Center for Social Policies of the Getulio Vargas Foundation shows that the percentage of Catholics in the neighborhood is in the range 40-60%. Santa Cruz is still among the three districts most evangelicals with 28.64% of practitioners. In the ranking of no religion, Santa Cruz appears in second position with 19.86%.

The Catholic Church is present in five parishes and their 46 Christian churches, of chapels and churches, scattered throughout the neighborhood. It has grown quite a number of evangelical churches in the region, which also has spiritual centers and churches of other faiths.

== Symbols official ==
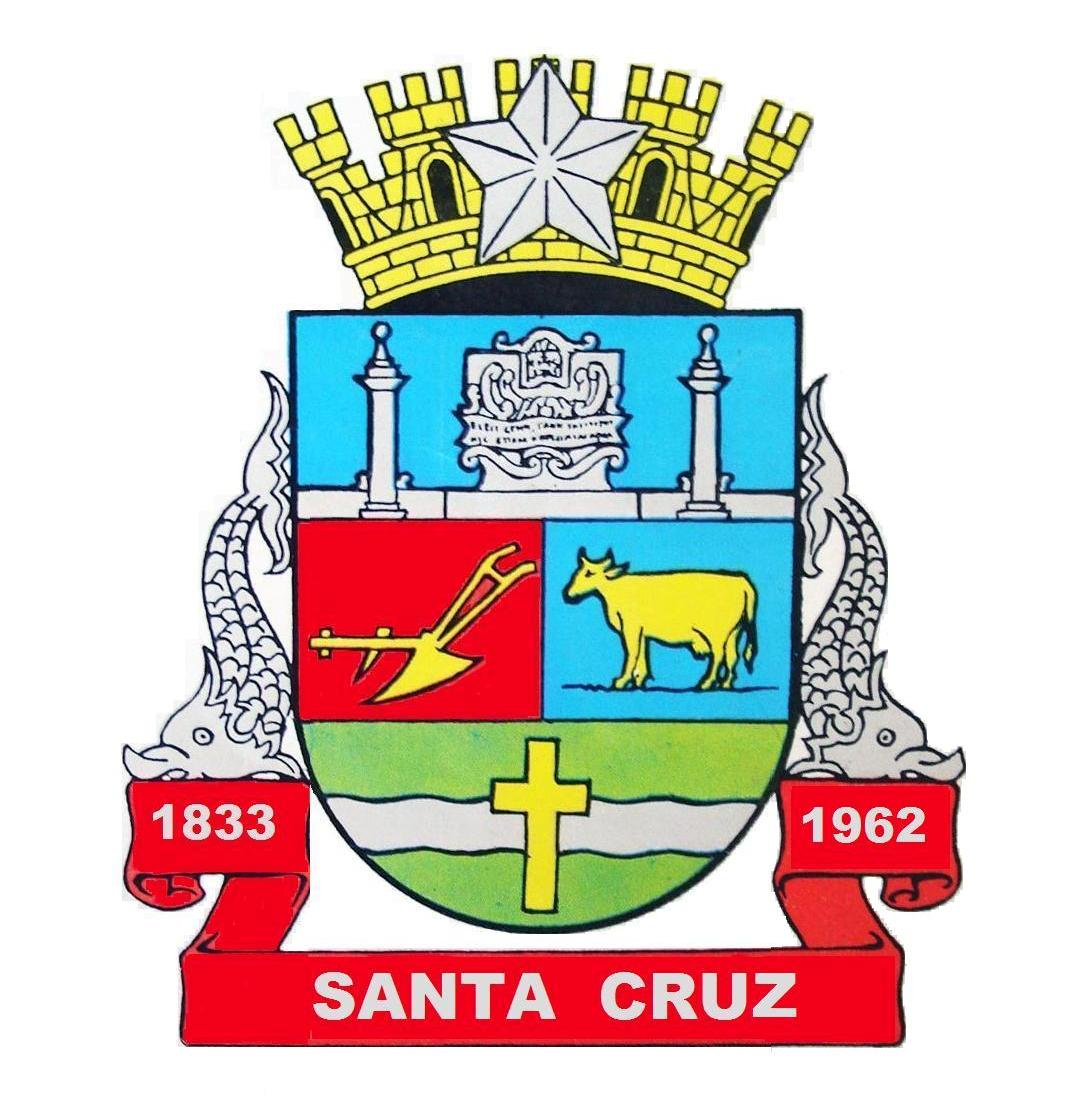
Coat of Arms of the Administrative Region of Santa Cruz

Although uncommon in Brazilian municipalities, some divisions of the municipality of Rio de Janeiro have coats of arms, flags and hymns, acquired at the time when their territory was understood in the former state of Guanabara. Santa Cruz has an anthem and also a coat of arms, launched on the occasion of the celebrations of the IV Centenary of Santa Cruz (1567-1967).

== Infrastructure ==
=== Education ===
Santa Cruz has a public and private education system that adequately meets the demand for basic education. According to information from City Hall, has 53 municipal school units that serve approximately 41,104 students during the elementary school and middle, outside other private institutions like Apollo XII College, College Don Oton Mota, Santa Monica Education Center and others.

There is a significant demand for high school education that is partially met by public, state, and private institutions. However, state schools remain insufficient to meet total demand, particularly in technical and vocational education. Nevertheless, it is located in Largo do Bodegão a CETEP, which offers numerous training courses and technical courses through the ETE Santa Cruz. The transfer to Santa Cruz institution SESI/SENAI of vocational education is also being essential to meet the demand for skilled labor, the new industrial ventures that bring in the region.

The higher education has very recent history and is taught only by private institutions. FAMA (University Machado de Assis) was a pioneer, being a local institution maintained by the Educational Association Machado de Assis and emerged in the mid 1990s, offering courses for undergraduate, graduate, and extension semipresential. After she appeared in several other campus institutions such as the Candido Mendes University and Estacio de Sa University.

Additionally, educational institutions in Santa Cruz are well-known for their sports and music programs.

=== Health ===
Santa Cruz has several hospitals and clinics, especially the Dom Pedro II Hospital and Polyclinic Lincoln de Freitas, and several private hospitals, as hospitals and Memorial Cemeru. However, most residents (70%) depends on the public health system and suffers from a lack of doctors and hospital beds in the hospital network. The problem is greater when there are cases of epidemic dengue. The lack of information and neglect of residents make the neighborhood has one of the highest rates of proliferation of the mosquito in the city. However, the recent deployment of Emergency Care Units - APU's, and Family Clinic adjacent to the neighborhood, is expected to alleviate the shortage of medical care for low-income families in Santa Cruz.

=== Water and sanitation ===
The water supply in Santa Cruz is made by the State Company for Water and Sewage of Rio de Janeiro (CEDAE). This has a drive on Morro do Mirante. There was constructed there in the 20th century a large water tank to supply the whole region, but today it is disabled.

The lack of piped water and sewage disposal system is critical in underserved areas of the neighborhood. Besides the lack of water supply and sewage disposal system at certain points, the network of illegal connections is another problem faced by the company in the neighborhood.

=== Transportation ===
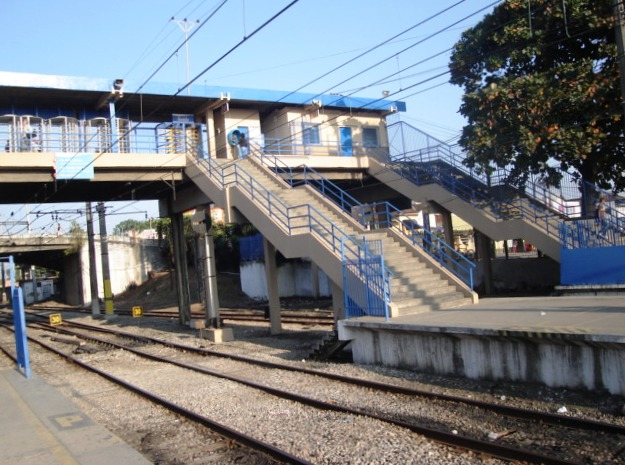
Santa Cruz train station

Santa Cruz has the final season of the second largest commuter rail extension of the Metropolitan Region of Rio de Janeiro, the Santa Cruz Extension. The same is operated by the SuperVia and the peak hours has an average interval of 12 minutes. There are integration services with buses using exclusively RioCard and there is a project to integrate pay with online Itaguaí of Central, which is being studied to be reactivated.

Santa Cruz has an Urban Bus Terminal at Rua Álvaro Alberto and has major access roads to the state capital. The main route is the Avenida Brasil, linking Santa Cruz to the center of Rio de Janeiro. The Avenida Cesário de Mello (formerly Caminho Imperial) links the neighborhood to Campo Grande. Highway BR-101 (Rio-Santos) begins in the neighborhood and connects Rio de Janeiro to municipalities of the Costa Verde region and moves to the coast of São Paulo. The Estrada da Pedra linking to the neighborhood of Guaratiba. The Estrada de Sepetiba connects Santa Cruz the neighborhood of Sepetiba.

There are other major thoroughfares, crossing the Avenue neighborhood as avenida Antares, avenida Areia Branca, avenida Isabel, avenida Pope João XXIII, Estrada da Urucânia, Rua Alvaro Alberto, rua Felipe Cardoso, avenida Padre Guilherme Decaminada, Rua Senador Câmara, among others.

Santa Cruz is the neighborhood of Rio de Janeiro that has the highest users of cycling. The vehicle is used by 12% of the population, while the average across the city is 2%. A bike lane connects the districts of Santa Cruz and Campo Grande following the railway line and integrating the stations.

In 2012 the TransOeste line, part of the BRT network, linked Santa Cruz with Campo Grande and Barra da Tijuca, reducing by up to half the average travel time. A project predicts the possibility of using the Airport Bartolomeu base air to assist in achieving the next sporting events hosted in the city.

=== Services and Communications ===
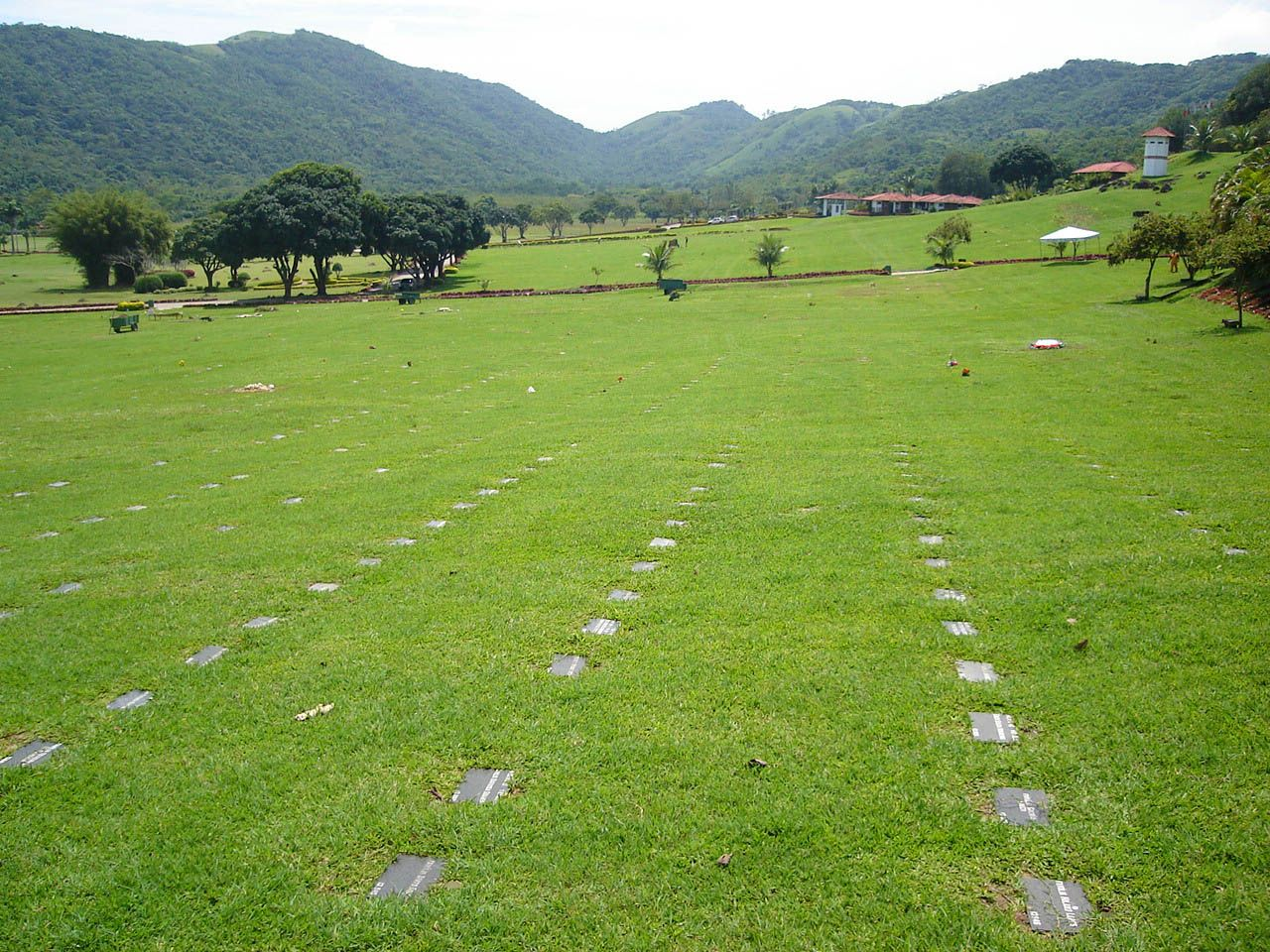
Jardim da Saudade Paciência cemetery

The district enjoys various public services, provided by the various levels of government and individuals, such as hospitals and clinics, the Center for Zoonosis Control Paulo Dacorso Filho, which is a reference in the municipality in the treatment of zoonosis and systems development Sanitary and Epidemiological Surveillance, the Resource Center Integrated Service Teen, various agencies of the Post Office and bank branches, a detachment of the Fire Brigade, the 36th Police Precinct and 27th Military Police Battalion, in addition to the municipal cemetery located near Matadouro and Jardim da Saudade cemetery.

The neighborhood was the first municipality to rely on the signal service of free broadband internet, the IluminaRio. Santa Cruz also has a television transmitting antenna for UHF channel 26, is currently not used by any broadcaster.

== Economy ==
Santa Cruz has a diversified economy, with rural areas, an important industrial area for the municipality and a business that has experienced significant growth in recent years.

=== Agriculture ===
During the Getúlio Vargas government in the 1930s, the region of Santa Cruz, went through great works of sanitation and the creation of agricultural colonies.

In 1938 came the first families of Japanese Mogi das Cruzes, São Paulo State, to fill the newly created lots Colonial Center and implement new experiences in agriculture. Even today there agricultural colonies that produce cassava, fruits and vegetables in the fields of Santa Cruz Air Base and coconut fields in Campo de São Miguel and Campo São Marcos on the banks of the Rio-Santos highway. In the region of the Jesuitas there are also several plantations and small herds of cattle.

=== Industry ===
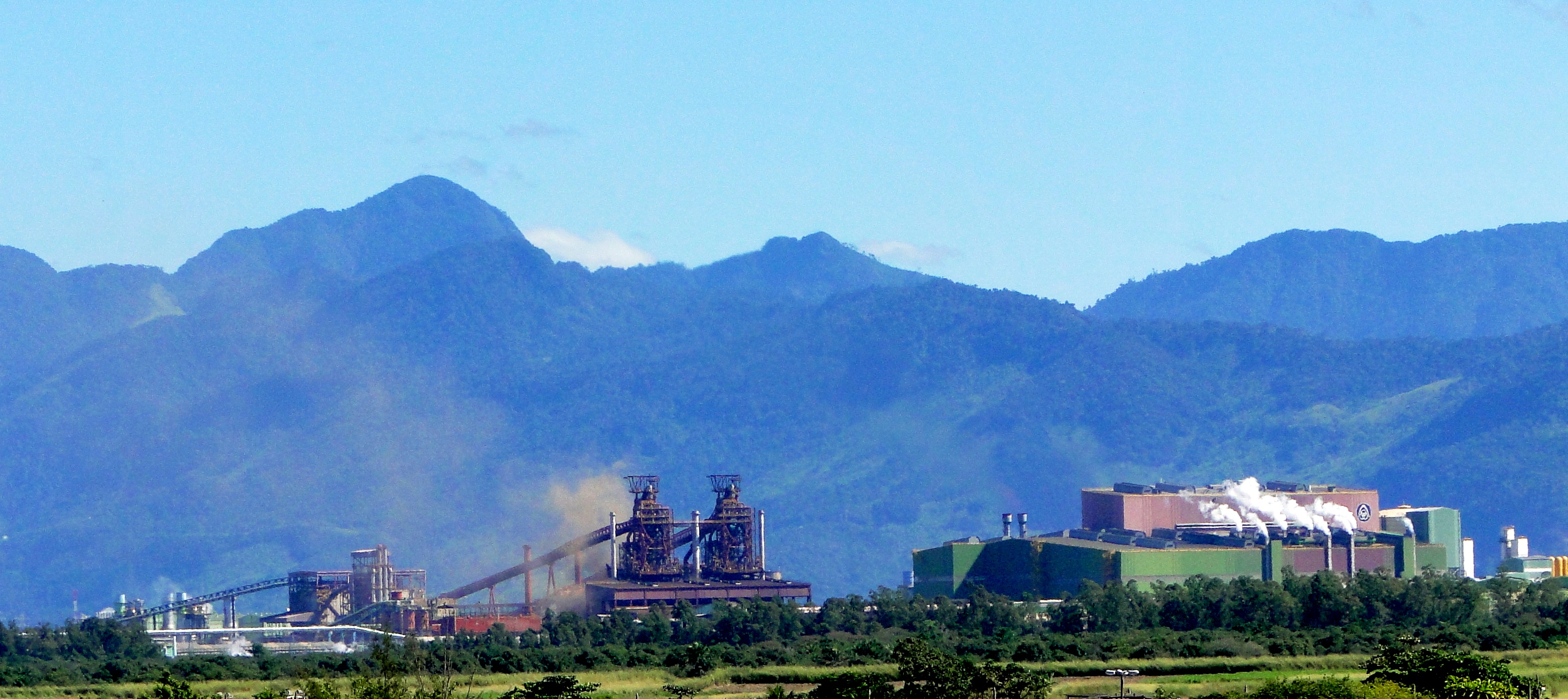
Ternium Brasil Steel mill

In the year 1960, the Rio de Janeiro is no longer the capital of the country to be the state of Guanabara. Finding himself without the resources of the federal administration, there was a need to seek alternatives to the economic development of the state. In 1975, opened the Industrial Zone of Santa Cruz.

In it are installed several industrial establishments, such as the Casa da Moeda do Brasil, Cosigua (Gerdau Group), Valesul, Ternium Brasil, White Martins, Glasurit, the Santa Cruz plant, Linde S/A, Ecolab Chemicals Ltd., Aluminum Cans S/A - LATASA, Factory Carioca Catalysts - FCC, Pan American S/A Chemical, among others. They are represented by AEDIN - Association of the Industrial District of Santa Cruz.

The Industrial Zone is located on the border between the municipality of Rio de Janeiro and the Itaguaí, and part of the back area of the Port of Itaguaí. The Atlantic Steel Company (CSA) was established in 2010, is the largest steel mill in South America, occupying an area of nine million square meters including a private marina, power plant, steel flat sheets for export and coke.

=== Trade ===
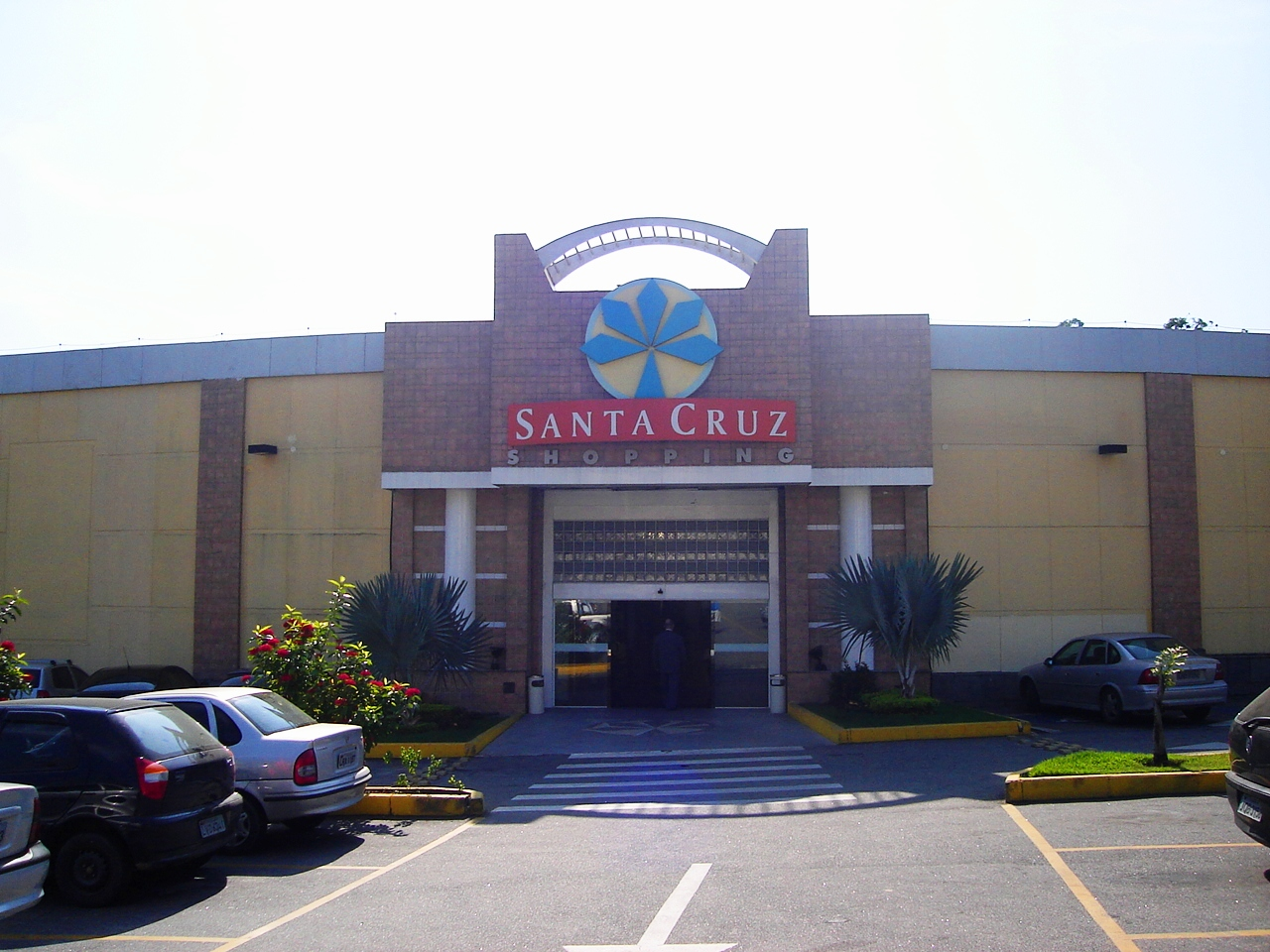
Santa Cruz Shopping mall

Santa Cruz in recent years has shown great growth in its trade and services sector targeting the local market, due to growth and rising incomes of the population.

The same has a shopping and entertainment, called Santa Cruz Shopping with food court, shops of various genres and banks, large supermarkets such as Guanabara, Prezunic and Extra hypermarkets as well as small neighborhood supermarket chains, restaurants, fast food like McDonald's, Bob's, Subway, Habib's and a large number of clothing stores, shoes, building materials, among others, stationers and bazaars, heavily concentrated on Rua Felipe Cardoso and its surroundings.

=== Culture ===
Among the most popular cultural events of the neighborhood is the feast of Sao Jorge held in the Largo Bodegao. The festival is a tradition that dates back 1963 and the number of devotees has only increased in Santa Cruz Carnival is celebrated with traditional carnival, fancy dances, and the contest bandstands promoted by the municipality. Yet you can see the figure on the streets folk clóvis (clown), so common in the region.

=== Tourist attractions, historical and cultural ===
Are recognized by law as for tourist, social, cultural municipality of Rio de Janeiro, the elected seven wonders of Santa Cruz: the Hangar do Zeppelin located at Air Base, the headquarters of Battalion School of Engineering (Villagran Cabrita), the Ruínas do Matadouro, Ponte dos Jesuítas in the sub-district of the Jesuitas, Igreja Nossa Senhora da Conceição, the Cidade das Crianças and Catedral das assembleias de Deus.

== Sports ==
Practicing sports is very common in Santa Cruz, especially in schools in the region, which are renowned for achievements in diverse forms of intercollegiate competition. One of the major acquisitions of the neighborhood in recent years was the Olympic Village Oscar Schmidt, a complex sports that offers free sports activities especially for children and youth in need.

In 2007 he founded the Santa Cruz Soccer Club, affiliated with FFERJ, who participates in state and interstate tournaments and has several categories. Among the sporting events happening in the neighborhood is the traditional bike ride involving more than two hundred cyclists traveling the main historical sights of Santa Cruz.

Partnership between businesses and NGOs active in the district comprise hundreds of children and adolescents around socioesportivos programs emphasizing the importance of values like self-esteem, teamwork, quality of life and citizenship.

=== Leisure ===
As one of the neighborhoods with few recreational options in the west, Santa Cruz has received special attention to the city hall facilities the theme park Children's Town, which offers visitors sports courts, water park, library, digital planetarium, as well as activities outdoors.

They are among the main leisure areas of the district court trials of the GRES Acadêmicos de Santa Cruz, the Santa Cruz Shopping, the Olympic Village Oscar Schmidt, the Lona Cultural Sandra de Sá and the Cidade das Crianças Leonel Brizola.

=== Santacruzenses ===
Born and lived in the neighborhood some personalities of the country at different times as the actor André Villon, Senator Júlio Cesário de Melo, Senator Otacílio Câmara de Carvalho, the football player Thiago Silva, MMA fighter's Marcos Oliveira,

== Gallery ==
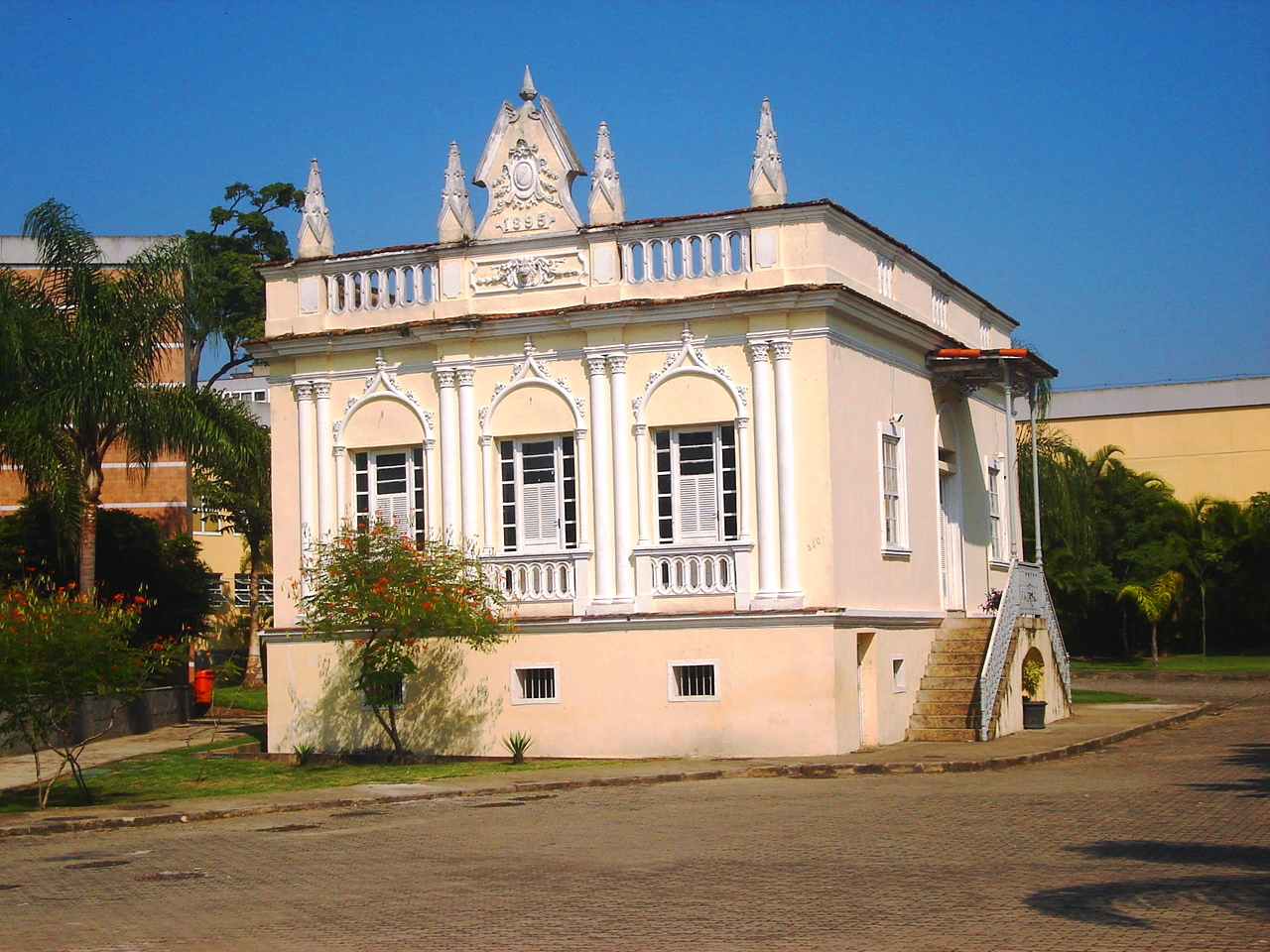
Araújos Mansion

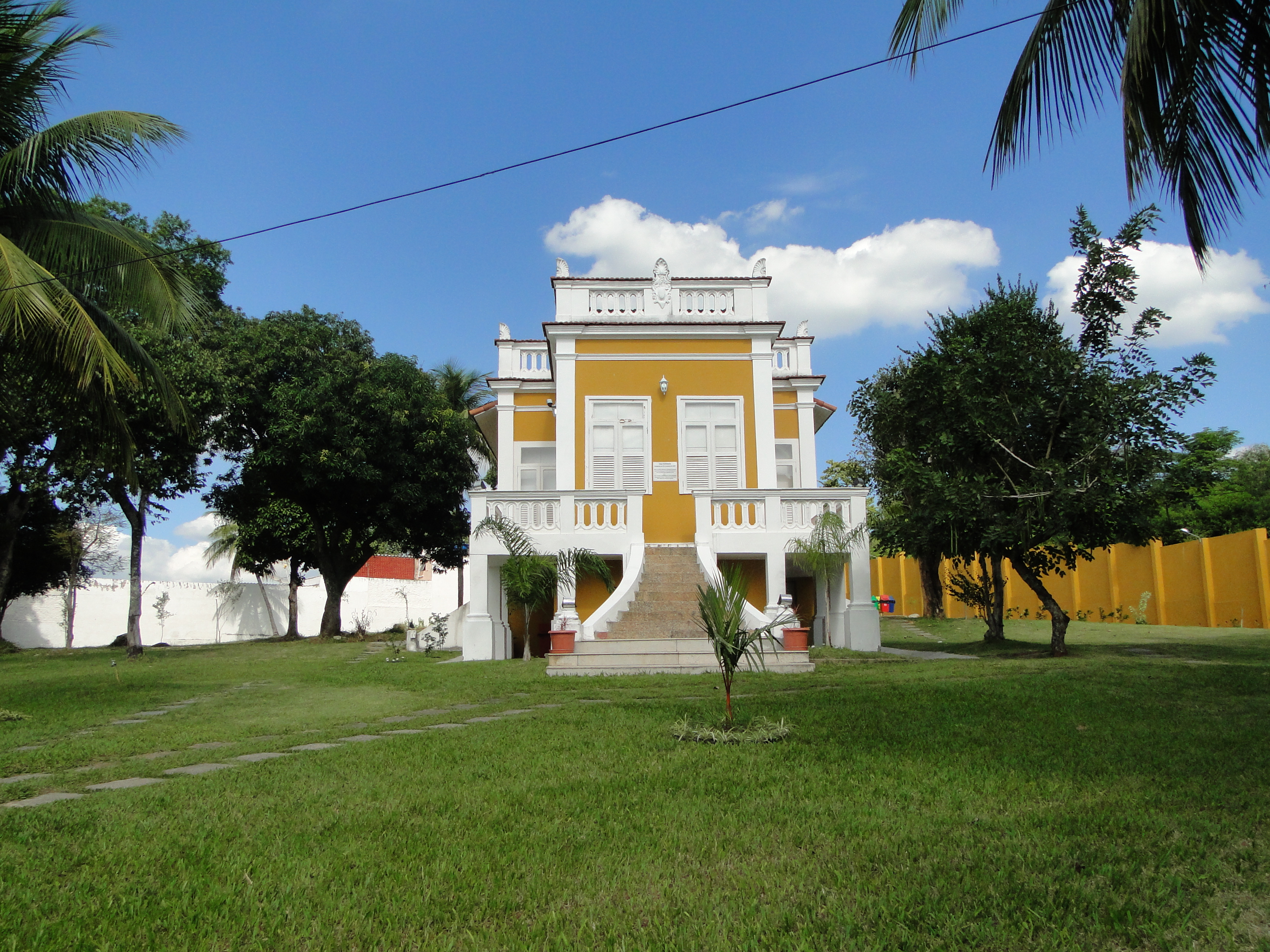
Júlio Cesário de Mello Mansion

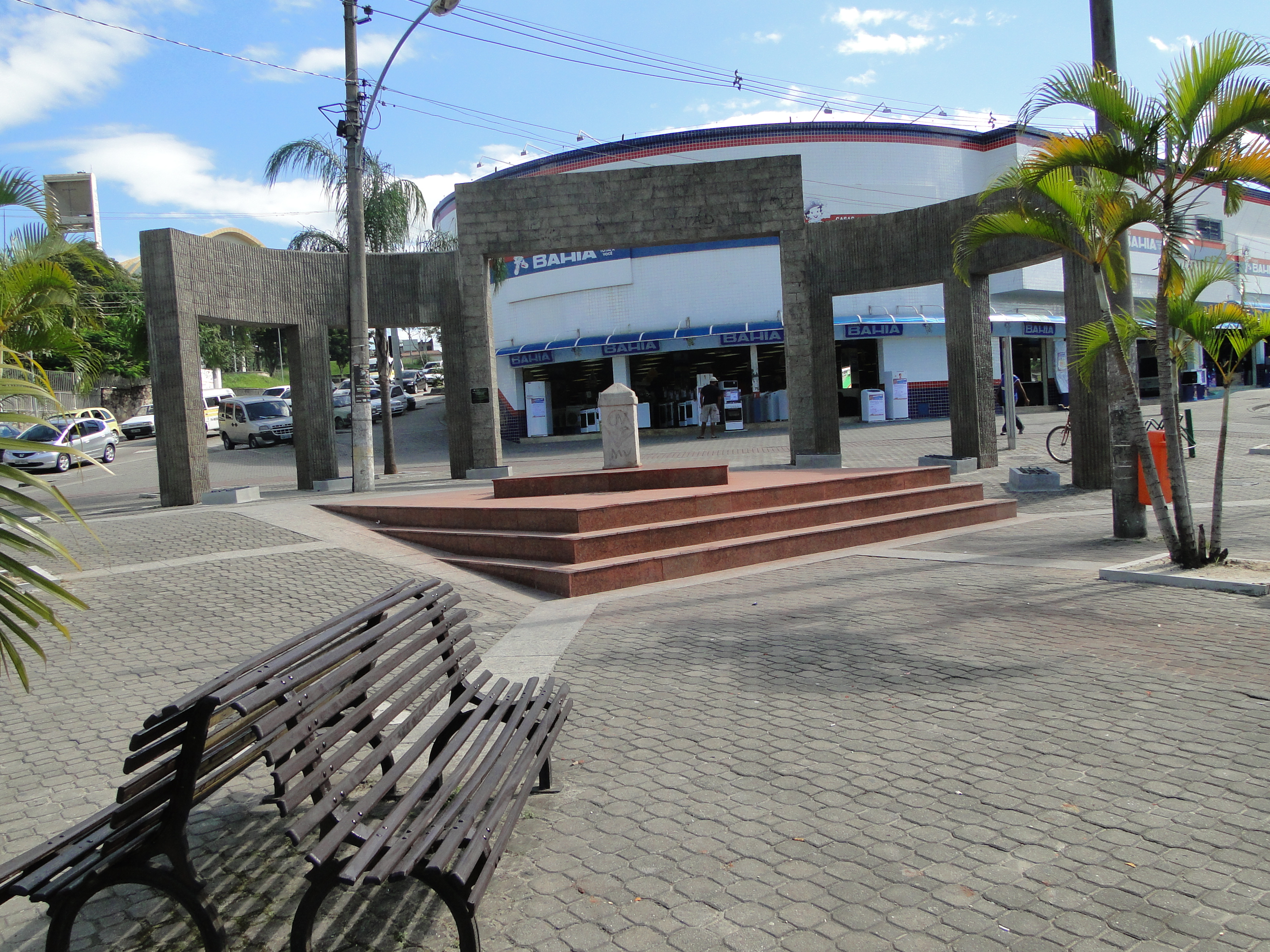
Marco XI Portico
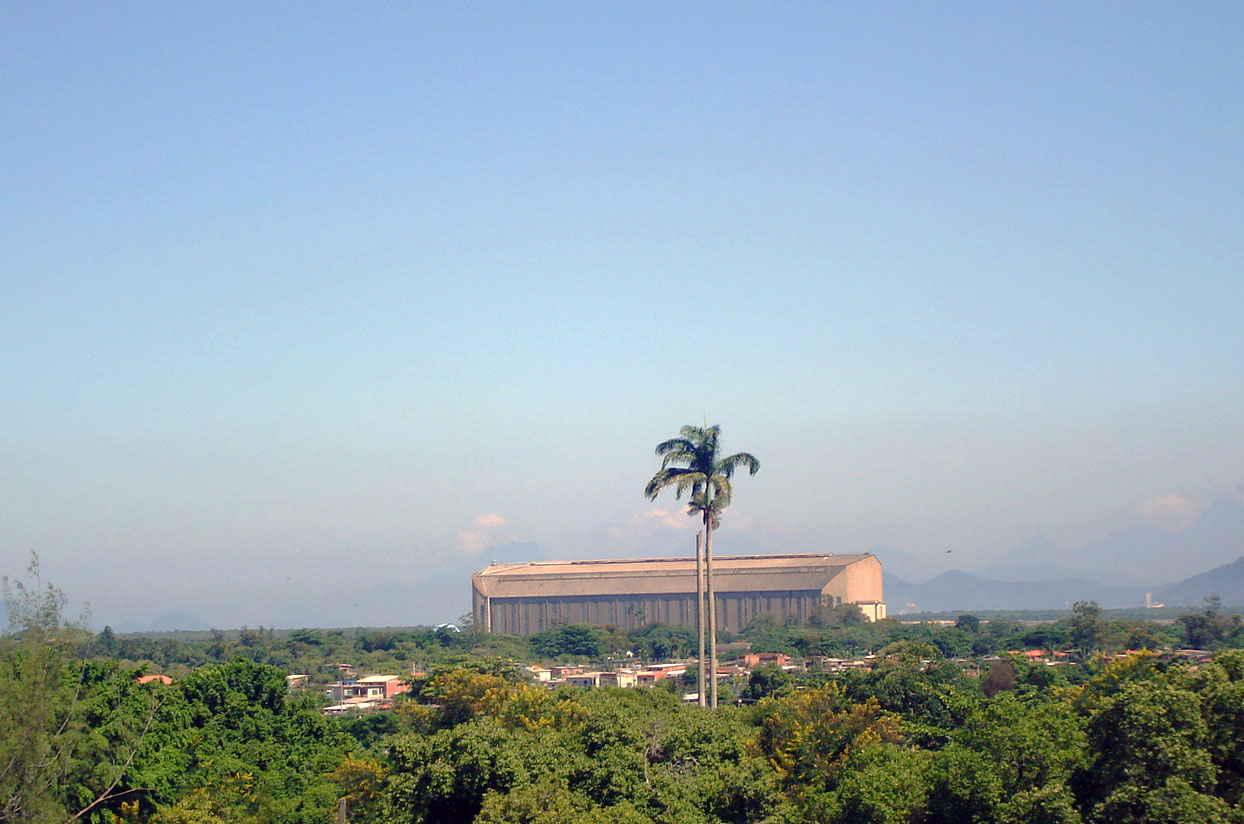
Hangar do Zeppelin

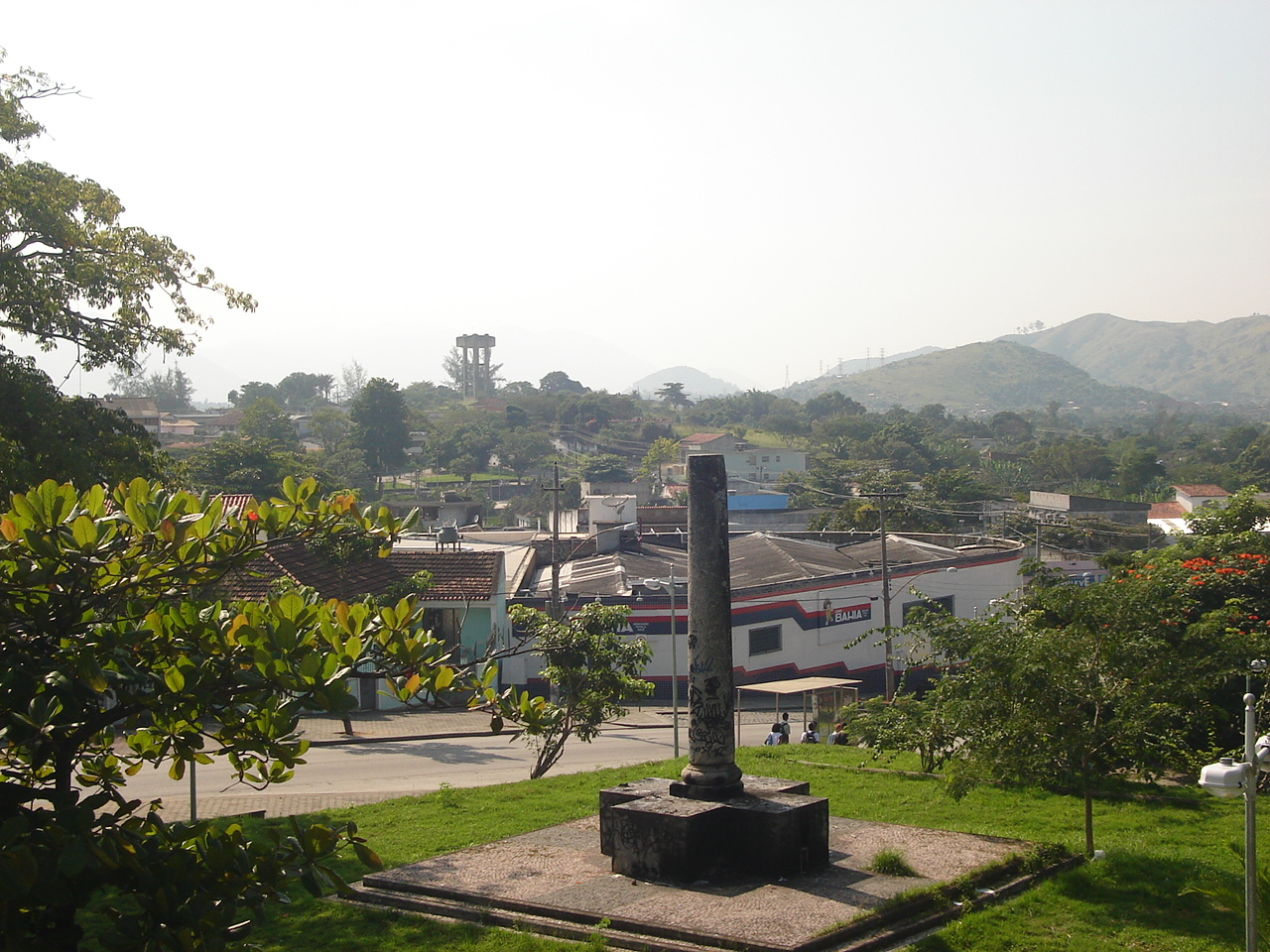
Monument 4th Centenary of Santa Cruz

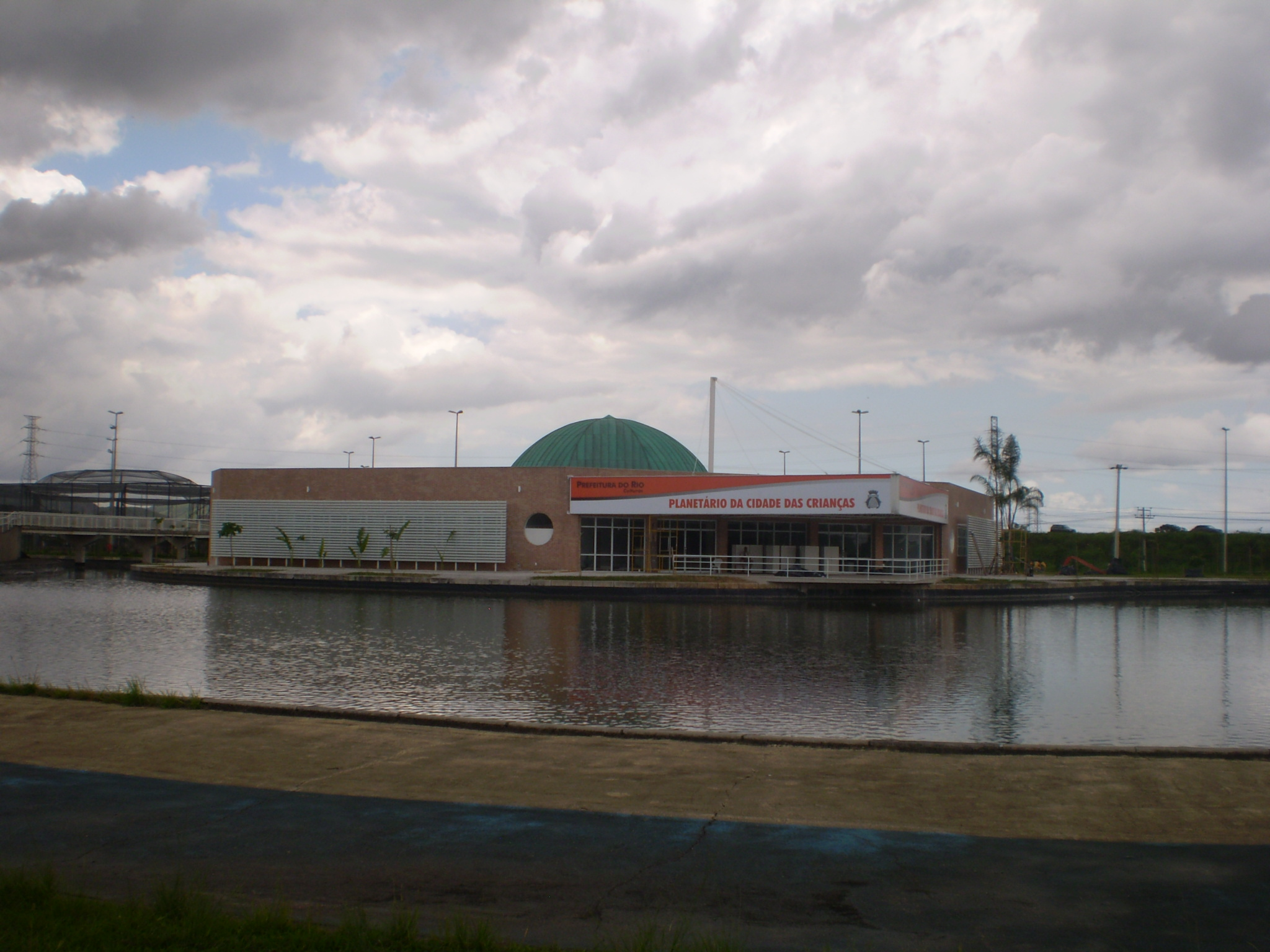
Planetarium of Cidade das Crianças.
