= Stadtsparkasse München =

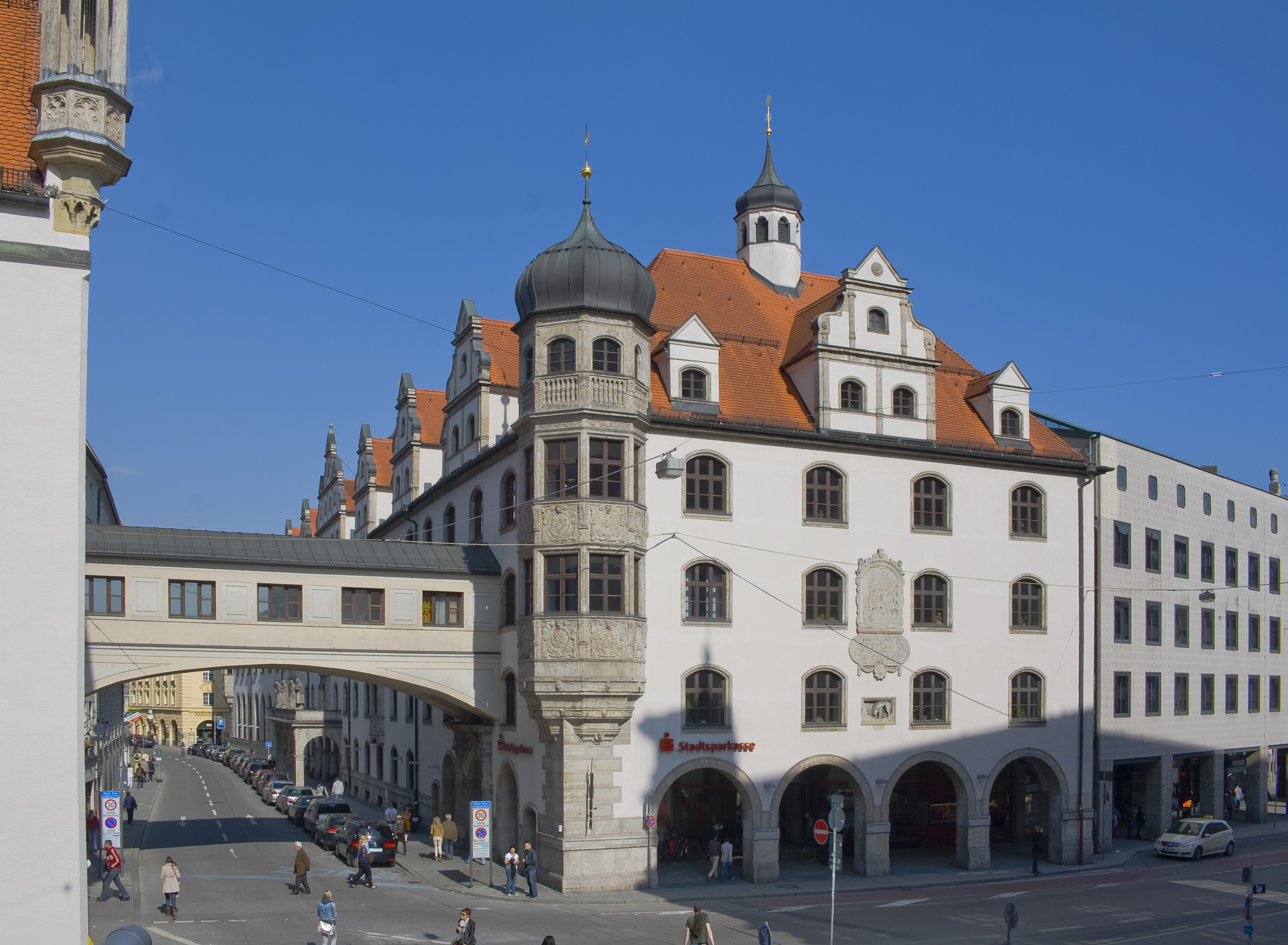
- Industry: Bank
- Founded: 1824
- Headquarters: Sparkassenstr.2, D-80331 Munich, Germany
- Net income: 30,639,473.02 euro (2017)
- Total assets: 17,982,937,263.11 euro (2017)
- Number of employees: 2,676 (2016)
- Website: www.sskm.de

Stadtsparkasse München is one of the oldest banks in Germany founded in 1824. The bank has total assets of more than 23 billion euro and is the fourth largest Sparkasse-group bank in Germany.

It is an institution under the public law and the legal basis is the Savings Banks Act, Bavarian Savings Bank Regulations, and Articles of Association issued by the City Council.

The bank is owed by the City of Munich, head of the board is major Dieter Reiter (SPD).

== Services ==
The Stadtsparkasse provides the universal banking business. It is a market leader in the private customer area in relation to main bank connections. Measured by the average balance sheet, it is the largest Bavarian and fifth largest German savings bank. The Stadtsparkasse cooperates with the LBS Bayerische Landesbauparkasse, DekaBank and Versicherungskammer Bayern, etc.

== History ==
On January 2, 1824, the Stadtsparkasse München (municipal savings bank) opened its first branch in Munich and was known as the "People's Bank". After the Second World War, it financed large parts of the reconstruction of Munich.

The bank's branches were located in drugstores and pharmacies. In 1894 there were twelve branches. In 1977 the bank had 100 and since then the number has been falling again. In 2023 there were 46.

== Charity ==
In 2014 it donated about 4.3 million euros for the social and cultural projects via its 6 foundations:

- Kundenstiftung "Gemeinsam Gutes tun"
- Kinder- und Jugendstiftung der Stadtsparkasse München
- Stiftung Soziales München
- Kulturstiftung
- Stiftung Straßenkunst
- Altenhilfestiftung.

== See also ==
- List of banks in the euro area
- List of banks in Germany
