= Delen Private Bank =

Belgian bank

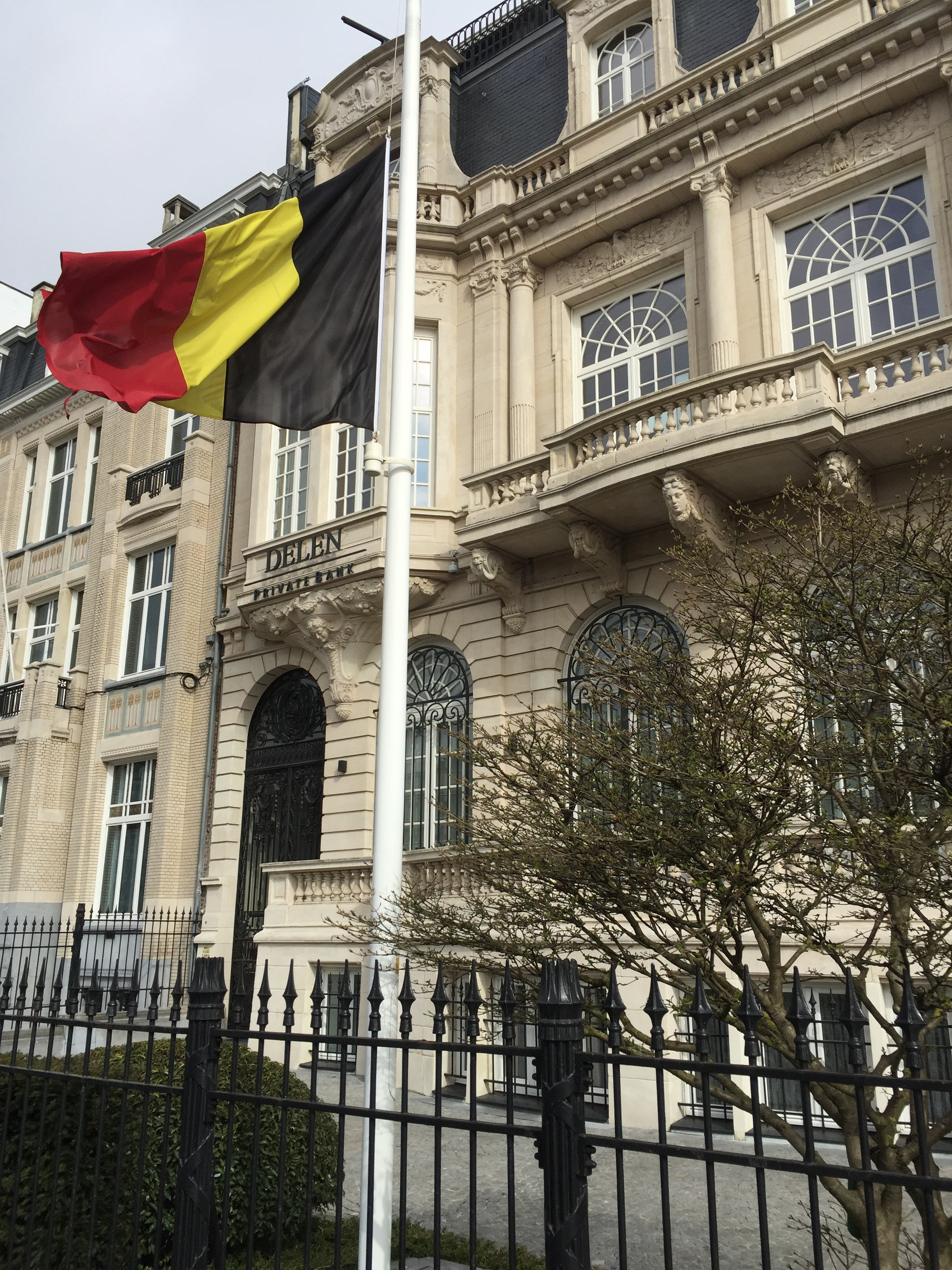
- The offices in Avenue de Tervuren in Etterbeek (Brussels)
- Industry: Financial services
- Founded: 1936
- Key people: Michel Buysschaert, CEO; Jacques Delen, Chairman
- Products: Banking and insurance
- Net income: 118,6 million euro (2019)
- Owner: Ackermans & van Haaren, Delen Family
- Number of employees: 718
- Website: www.delen.bank/en-be

Delen Private Bank is originally a Belgian bank that specialises in wealth management and the global planning of private and business assets of private customers.

== From stockbroker to private bank ==
André Delen founded a brokerage firm in Antwerp in 1936. In 1975, he left the management to his sons and Jacques Delen, the youngest of them, became CEO. In 1990, with the cooperation of Paul De Winter, the emphasis was placed on discretionary asset management. In 1992, the Antwerp stockbroking company became part of the holding company Ackermans & van Haaren and together they form a group, which also includes the sister bank Bank J. Van Breda & Co. In 1994, Delen took over the Bank O. de Schaetzen in order to strengthen its position and acquire banking status. Various mergers and acquisitions followed.

== Mergers and acquisitions ==
In 1996, stockbroking company De Ferm merged into Bank Delen. The Brussels-based company Havaux joined the group in 2000. In 2007, Capital & Finance - the originator of the management company Capfi Delen Private Bank Asset Management - in turn merged with Delen.

Subsequently, in 2011, Delen acquired a 74% majority stake in UK brokerage JM Finn & Co (Ltd). In July 2015, Delen Private Bank reached an agreement to acquire Oyens & Van Eeghen. With this transaction, Delen entered the Dutch market. Since the beginning of 2022, it has operated here under the flag of Delen Private Bank and no longer Oyens & Van Eeghen.

In 2019, René Havaux succeeded Paul De Winter as head of the bank.

As a result of these acquisitions and growth, in 2020 the bank will manage an amount of 43.6 billion euros for customers in the Benelux, the United Kingdom and Switzerland.

In 2023, Michel Buysschaert succeeded René Havaux as head of the bank.

Delen Private Bank is the largest discretionary asset manager in Belgium and a leader in the digitalisation of private banking services. The bank is controlled by Ackermans & van Haaren (78.75%) and by the Delen family via the company Promofi (21.25%). The total assets under management amount to 53.56 billion euro.

== Branches ==
There are branches in Antwerpen, Brasschaat, Brussel, Ghent, Hasselt, Knokke-Heist, Leuven, Luik, Namen, Roeselare, Waregem, Waterloo and Westerlo.

== See also ==
- List of banks in the euro area
- List of banks in Belgium
