= Frankfurter Volksbank =

German bank

Coordinates: 50.114975°N 8.676506°E

Frankfurter Volksbank eG
- Type: Cooperative bank
- Industry: cooperative movement financial service activities, except insurance and pension funding
- Predecessor: Frankfurter Genossenschaftsbank
- Founded: 1862
- Headquarters: Frankfurt, Germany
- Total assets: €12,111 million (2018)
- Members: 254,699 (2018)
- Number of employees: 1,658 (2018)
- Website: www.frankfurter-volksbank.de

The Frankfurter Volksbank eG is a Cooperative bank and has its headquarters in Frankfurt am Main. The bank's business area includes the city of Frankfurt and parts of the surrounding area.

== History ==
The history of the Frankfurter Volksbank goes back to the year 1862. On 19 May 1862, the Frankfurter Gewerbekasse was founded by 81 well-known Frankfurt citizens. As early as the end of November 1862, a committee was set up to form a savings and advance bank.

The first CEO was the Frankfurt banker Adolph Reinach (Chairman of the Board from 1862 to 1870). On 1 October 1862, the business was taken up in the house of the cashier, the card deck manufacturer Caspar Ludwig Wüst, in Gallusstr. 15. On 11 November 1862, the senate of the free and imperial city of Frankfurt granted the bank the right as a legal entity.

The bank experienced a quick boom. To this the end of the guild restrictions in Frankfurt in January 1864 contributed which spurred the development of craftsmanship. In the first 5 years from 1862 to 1867 the number of members increased from 81 to 694, the balance sheet total increased from 42,000 to almost 1 million Guilders and 112,000 Guilders of savings had been raised. In addition, the company was profitable and paid a dividend, which increased from 6% (1863) to 7% (1867). The company continued to grow in the following years, until it suffered a setback for the first time during the Panic of 1873. So the membership numbers increased from 1525 in 1872 to 2153 in 1875 to fall again in 1881 to 1863.

In 1868, the bank moved from the Hotel du Nord to a new premises at Neue Kornmarkt 18. In 1873 another move to the Große Eschenheimer Gasse took place to the building of Leopold Sonnemanns (a co-founder of the bank) Frankfurter Zeitung.

In 1878, the house on the corner of Börsenstraße / Freßgass was acquired as the headquarters.

Another factor that increased the attractiveness for members was the amendment of the Prussian Cooperative Law of 1868. While all members so far in solidarity were liable with their own assets, the solidarity liability was repealed on 20 February 1890. In the year 1914 one counted 3190 members and possessed over 3 million Mark worth of business shares. The annual dividends fluctuated between 5 and 8 percent.

The inflation in the early 1920s also hit the Gewerbekasse hard. Although the business achieved to increase the number of members in 1925 to 4203, the value of the shares fell to 187,510 Rentenmark. That the bank survived this difficult time at all was also the result of the work of the chairman of the board, Wilhelm Keller, who ran the bank from 1913 to 1936. With interruption during the world economic crisis, the 20s and 30s were also times of strong growth. In 1930 the balance sheet totaled 10.1 million Mark, in 1942 it was 16.24 million Mark.

In 1942, four cooperative banks in Frankfurt were forcibly merged into Frankfurter Volksbank. In addition to the Frankfurter Gewerbekasse, these were the Frankfurter Genossenschaftsbank (founded in 1897), the name giving Frankfurter Volksbank (founded in 1908) and the Bank für Handel und Gewerbe (founded in 1925).

- The Frankfurter Genossenschaftsbank (cooperative bank) was established in 1897 as Handwerker Spar- und Vorschußkasse eGmbH (craftsman savings and loan fund) by 16 founders. Since 13 December 1909 it traded as Frankfurter Genossenschaftsbank. In 1920/21 it had begun to open branches in Bad Homburg and Oberursel. Since 1922 the main branch was in Biebergasse 10.
- The Volksbank Frankfurt am Main was founded in 1908 as Spar- und Darlehenskasse der Hausbesitzer zu Frankfurt am Main eGmbH (savings and loan fund of the homeowners). 1940 it was renamed Volksbank.
- The Bank Handel und Gewerbe (bank for commerce and trade) was founded in 1925 as Volks-Spar- und Creditcasse eGmbH and since 1928 has been called Bank für Handel und Gewerbe.

Together, the merged institution now had 4819 members and a balance sheet total of 47 million Marks.

As a result of the currency reform, large parts of the capital were lost again. The Deutsche Mark opening balance of 21 June 1948 showed that a balance sheet total of 76 million Reichsmark became 5 million Deutsche Mark. Of these, 3.6 million compensation claims were against the public sector from the assets side. The bank had 4400 members. With the Wirtschaftswunder, the bank again grew strongly in the following years. In 1961 it had 8082 members and 6.2 million Deutsche Mark equity.

In 1970, other traditional Volksbanks in the Frankfurt area were merged into Frankfurter Volksbank. Those were the Volksbanken from Kronberg (founded 1862, 2,200 members, 45 Mio. Deutsche Mark total assets), Rödelheim (founded 1863) as well as Bockenheim (34 Mio. Deutsche Mark total assets, founded 1863). The latter had already merged with Volksbank Eschborn (founded 1926) and Volksbank Niederrad (founded 1872) in 1955.

In subsequent years, a series of further mergers with other Volksbanks took place.

- 1981 Bornheimer Volksbank (founded 1881), which in 1954 had merged with Volksbank Bonames (founded 1870)
- 1990 Volksbank Vortaunus (founded 1899)
- 1994 Königsteiner Volksbank (founded 1865)
- 1998 Raiffeisenbank Maintal (a merger of Raiffeisenbanken Maintal-Bischofsheim and Maintal-Dörnigheim)
- 1999 BVB Volksbank (founded 1924 as Bad Vilbeler Volksbank, was merged with Raiffeisenbank Berkersheim in 1981, was merged with Bergen-Enkheimer Volksbank in 1991); Volksbank Heldenbergen (founded 1868) and Raiffeisenbank Bad Homburg (founded 1863)
- 2000 Volksbank Raiffeisenbank Hanau (founded1864) and Volksbank Usinger Land (founded 1863)
- 2002 Volksbank Mörfelden-Walldorf (founded 1891) and Volksbank Kelsterbach (founded 1889)
- 2003 Offenbacher Volksbank (founded 1865) and Volks- und Raiffeisenbank Weilmünster (founded 1865)
- 2004 Raiffeisenbank Bruchköbel (founded 1893)
- 2006 Volksbank Egelsbach (founded 1883)
- 2009 Volksbank Main-Taunus (founded 1900)
- 2012 Vereinigte Volksbank Griesheim-Weiterstadt (founded 1888)
- 2016 Volksbank Höchst a. M. (founded 1862)
- 2018 Volksbank Griesheim (founded 1871) and Vereinigte Volksbank Maingau (founded 1863)

== See also ==
- List of banks in the euro area
- List of banks in Germany
