= Sepetiba =

- Neighborhood
- Location in Brazil
- Coordinates: 22°58′08″S 43°41′44″W
- Country: Brazil
- State: Rio de Janeiro (RJ)
- Municipality/City: Rio de Janeiro
- Zone: West Zone

Sepetiba is a neighborhood in the West Zone of Rio de Janeiro, Brazil, surrounded by Santa Cruz and Guaratiba, and by the Sepetiba Bay. It occupies an area of 1,162.13 ha, and has a population of 35,892 (according to Instituto Brasileiro de Geografia e Estatística, IBGE, 2000 demographic census).

The origin of the name Sepetiba is the Tupi, which has the word "Sipitiba" as an alternative and çape-typa or çape-tyua as a corruption of the name, meaning Campo dos Sapés (Sapé field, in English), or Sapezal.

Close to Sepetiba is the port of Sepetiba Terminal. The port handles containers and general bulk cargo. Its maximum draft is 22.5m.
