= List of banks in Portugal =

Banks in Portugal

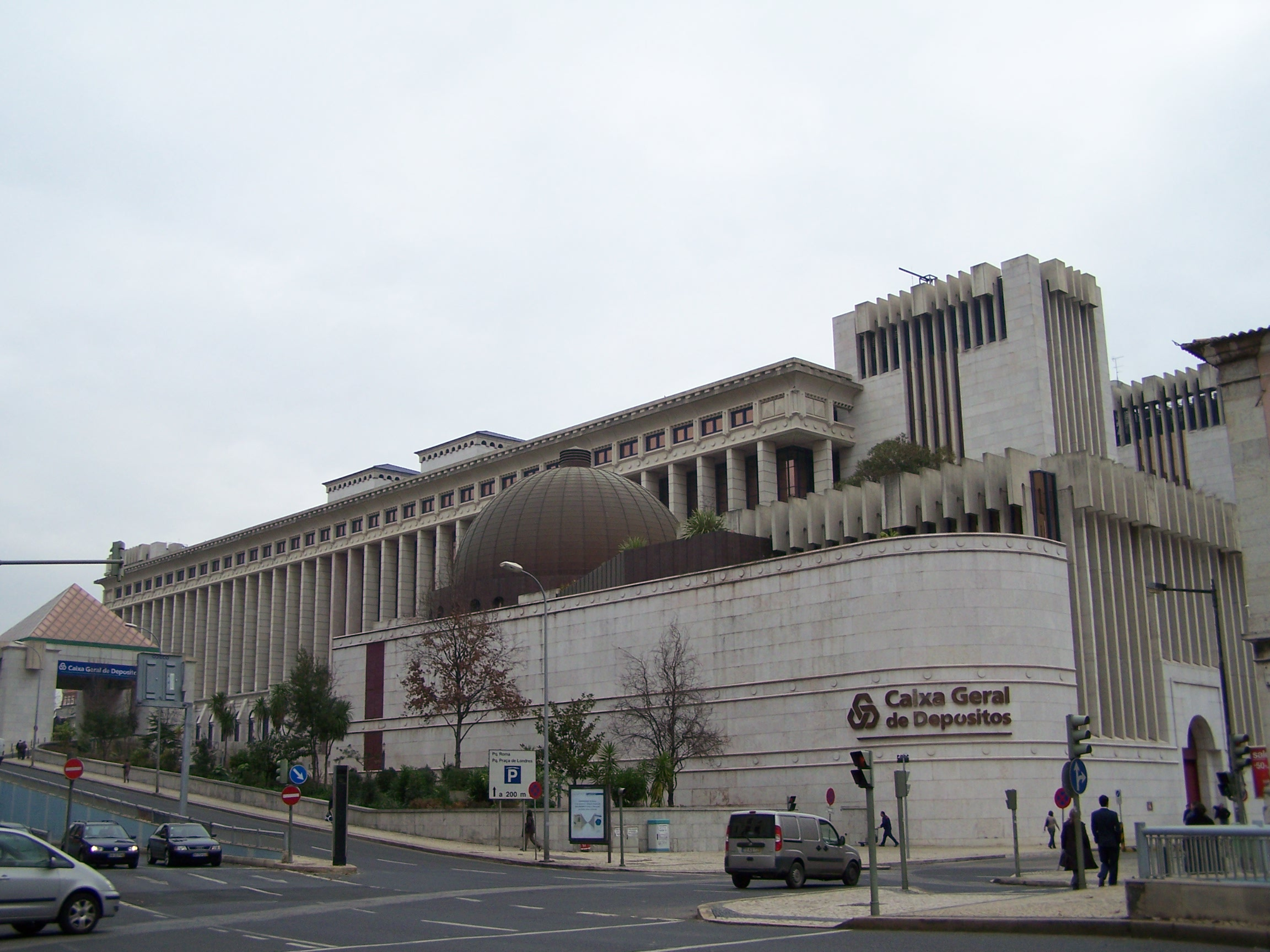
CGD head office, Lisbon

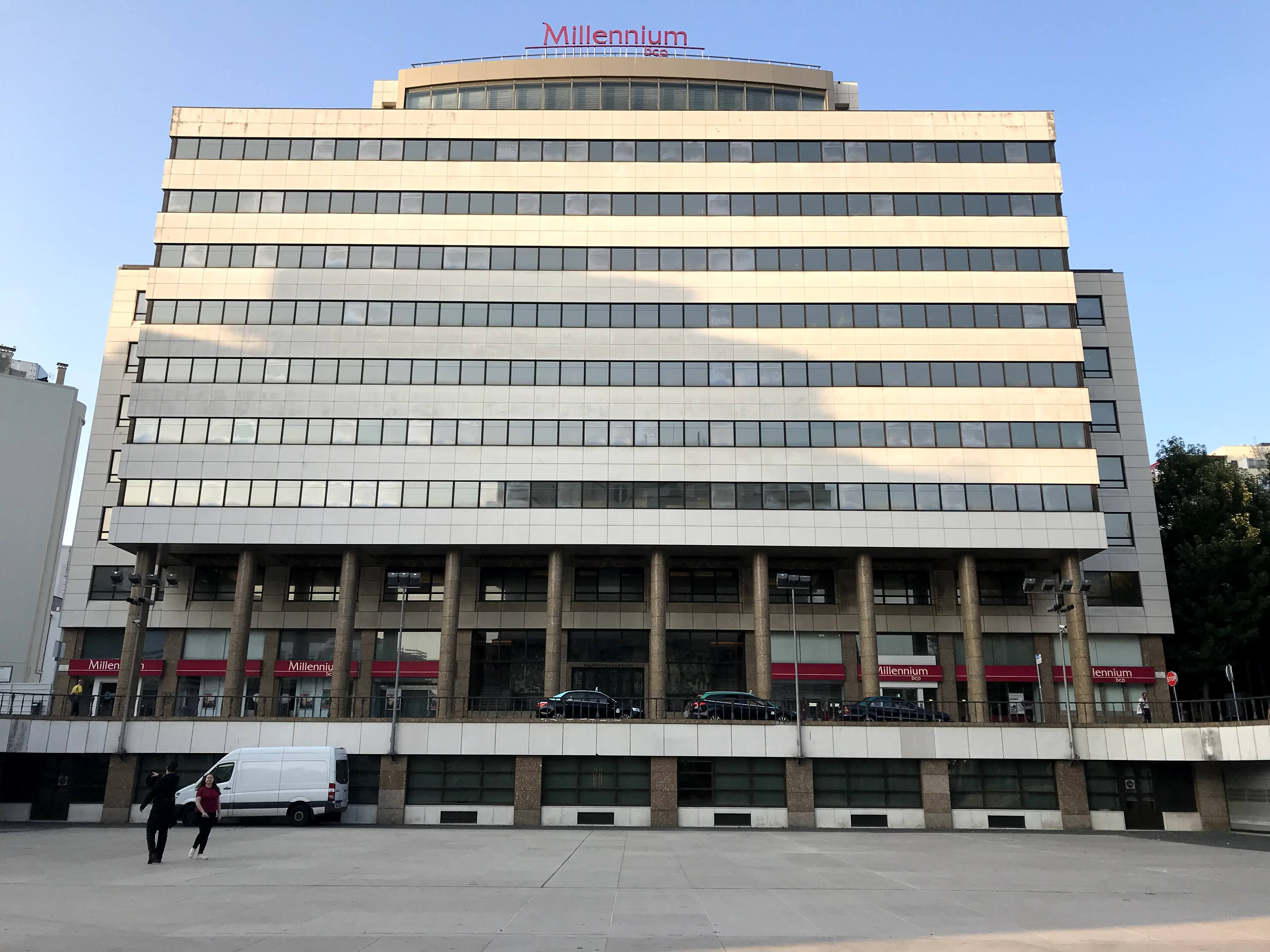
BCP head office, Porto

Santander building in downtown Lisbon

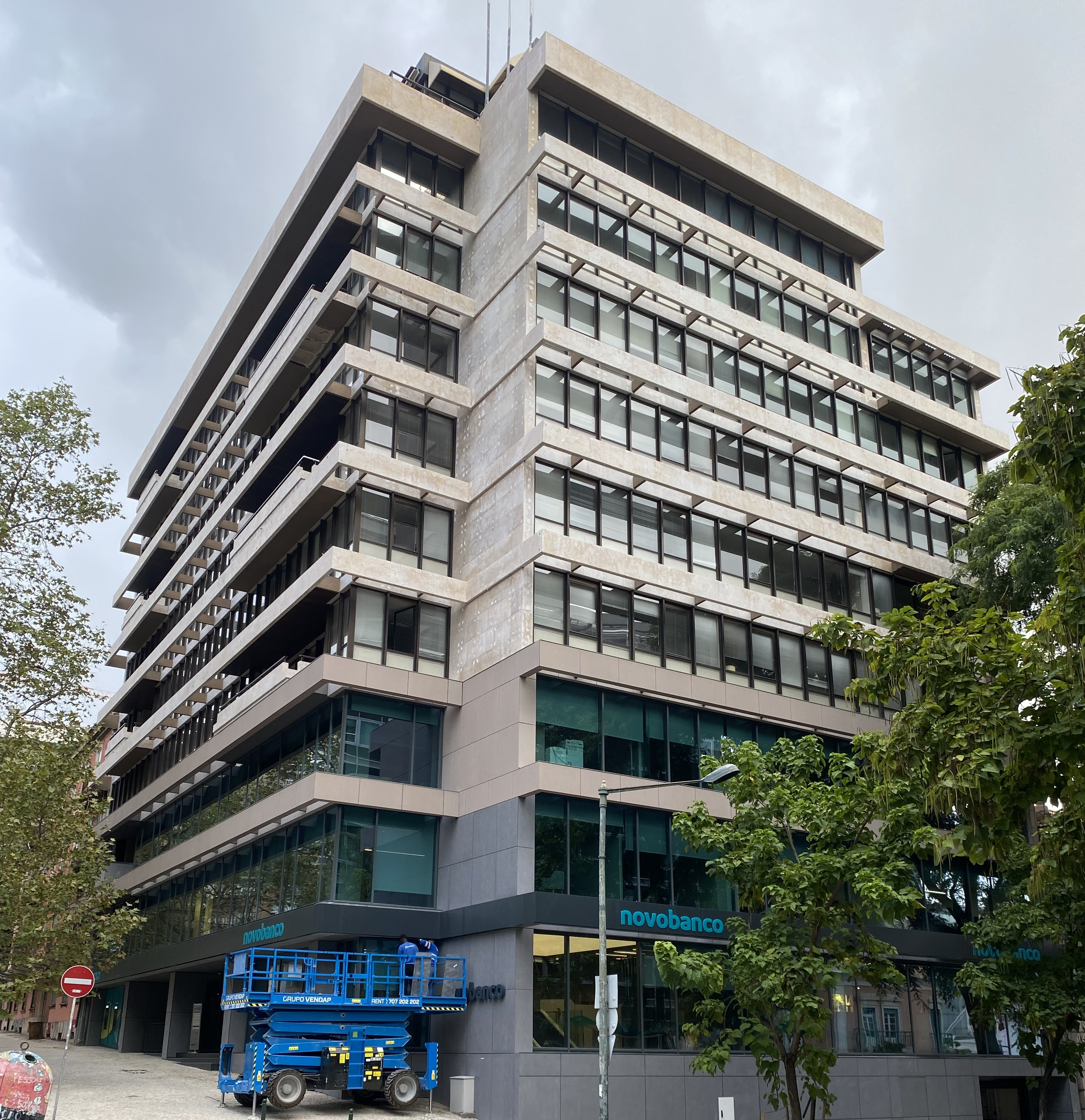
Novo Banco head office, Lisbon

The following list of banks in Portugal is to be understood within the framework of the European single market and European banking union, which means that Portugal's banking system is more open to cross-border banking operations than peers outside of the EU.

== Policy framework ==
European banking supervision distinguishes between significant institutions (SIs) and less significant institutions (LSIs), with SI/LSI designations updated regularly by the European Central Bank (ECB). Significant institutions are directly supervised by the ECB using joint supervisory teams that involve the national competent authorities (NCAs) of individual participating countries. Less significant institutions are supervised by the relevant NCA on a day-to-day basis, under the supervisory oversight of the ECB. In Portugal's case, the NCA is the Bank of Portugal.

== Significant institutions ==
As of 1 September 2026, the list of supervised institutions maintained by the ECB included the following two Portuguese banking groups as SIs, with names as indicated by the ECB for each group's consolidating entity:

- Banco Comercial Português SA (BCP)
- Caixa Geral de Depósitos SA (CGD)

LSF / Novo Banco has been acquired by BPCE (which already owns Banco Primus in Portugal), and other euro-area-based banking groups also have operations in Portugal. A study published in 2024 assessed that the bank with most aggregate assets in Portugal (as opposed to total consolidated assets) as of end-2023 was CGD at €99 billion, followed by BCP (€68 billion), Santander (€65 billion, via Banco Santander Portugal), Novo Banco (€44 billion), and CaixaBank (€39 billion, via Banco BPI). Other euro-area banking groups are unmentioned in this list because they operate in Portugal via a branch, such as BBVA, even though it also maintains a Portuguese subsidiary. The two other euro-area SIs that operate in Portugal via subsidiaries are Abanca and Crédit Agricole.

== Less significant institutions ==
As of 1 September 2025, the ECB's list of supervised institutions included 94 Portuguese LSIs.

=== High-impact LSIs ===
Of these, the following three were designated by the ECB as "high-impact" on the basis of several criteria including size:

- Banco CTT SA, subsidiary of CTT Correios de Portugal
- Caixa Central de Crédito Agrícola Mútuo CRL, central entity of the Crédito Agrícola Group (see also below)
- Caixa Económica Montepio Geral SA, central entity of the Montepio Group

=== Local agricultural cooperatives ===
72 other LSIs were local agricultural cooperatives (Portuguese: Caixa de Crédito Agrícola Mútuo). Of these, 67 were part of the Crédito Agrícola Group, whereas the following 5 were run independently:

- Caixa de Crédito Agrícola Mútuo de Bombarral CRL
- Caixa de Crédito Agrícola Mútuo da Chamusca CRL
- Caixa de Crédito Agrícola Mútuo de Leiria CRL
- Caixa de Crédito Agrícola Mútuo de Mafra CRL
- Caixa de Crédito Agrícola Mútuo de Torres Vedras CRL

=== Other Portuguese LSIs ===
The ECB list included the following 15 additional domestic institutions:

- 321 Crédito - Instituição Financeira de Crédito SA, subsidiary of CTT
- Alves Ribeiro - Investimentos Financeiros SGPS SA
  - Banco Invest SA, owned by Alves Ribeiro
- Atlantico Europa SGPS SA
  - Banco Atlântico Europa, owned by Atlantico Europa
- Banco de Investimento Global SA
- Banco Finantia SA
- Banco L.J. Carregosa SA
- Banco Português de Gestão SA
- Bison Bank SA
- Caixa Económica da Misericórdia de Angra do Heroísmo, Caixa Económica Bancária SA
- Montepio Crédito - Instituição Financeira de Crédito SA, part of Montepio Group (see above)
- Montepio Investimento SA, part of Montepio Group
- SOFID - Sociedade para o Financiamento do Desenvolvimento, Instituição Financeira de Crédito SA
- UNICRE - Instituição Financeira de Crédito SA

=== Non-euro-area-controlled LSIs ===
Based on the same ECB list, four Portuguese LSIs were affiliates of financial groups based outside the euro area:

- (Angola) Banco BAI Europa SA, subsidiary of Banco Angolano de Investimentos
- (Angola) BNI - Banco de Negócios Internacional (Europa) SA, subsidiary of Banco BNI
- (China) Haitong Bank SA, subsidiary of Haitong Securities
- (Brazil) Itaú BBA Europe SA, subsidiary of Itaú Unibanco

As of October 2025, there were no branches of banks located outside the European Economic Area ("third-country branches" in EU parlance) in Portugal, based on data compiled by the European Banking Authority.

== Other institutions ==
The Bank of Portugal and Banco Português de Fomento are public credit institutions that do not hold a banking license under EU law. Caixas economicas (small local savings banks) under public law are also specifically exempted from application of the EU Capital Requirements Directives.

== Defunct banks ==
A number of former Portuguese banks, defined as having been headquartered in the present-day territory of Portugal, are documented on Wikipedia, listed below in chronological order of establishment.

- Crédito Predial Português (1863-2004)
- Banco Nacional Ultramarino (1864-2001)
- Banco Espírito Santo (1869-2016)
- Banco da Régua (1874-1886)
- Banco Fernandes Magalhães (1905-1975)
- Banco Português do Atlântico (1942-2000)
- Banco Pinto de Magalhães (1952-1978)
- Banco Totta-Aliança (1961-1969)
- Banco Totta & Açores (1970-2004)
- Banif Financial Group (1988-2015)
- Banco Português de Negócios (1993-2008)
- Finibanco (1993-2013)
- Banco Privado Português (1996-2010)
- EuroBic (2008-2024)

== See also ==
- List of banks in the euro area
- List of banks in Europe
