= António Horta-Osório =

Portuguese-British banker (born 1964)

Sir António Horta-Osório
- Born: António Mota de Sousa Horta-Osório; 28 January 1964 (age 62); Lisbon, Portugal
- Education: Catholic University of Portugal; INSEAD; Harvard Business School
- Occupation: Banker
- Years active: 1987–present
- Spouse: Ana Horta-Osório
- Children: 3

Sir António Mota de Sousa Horta-Osório (born 28 January 1964) is a Portuguese-British banker who has been a prominent figure in the financial services industry for over 30 years, with a successful international career in banking covering commercial and retail banking, asset management, and investment banking. In 2021, he was knighted by Queen Elizabeth II for his work in banking and voluntary services in the fields of mental health and culture.

== Early life ==
=== Family ===
He is the son of António Lino de Sousa Horta Osório and Adélia Maria Mendonça Mota, maternal grandson of Carlos Cecílio Nunes Góis Mota, and paternal grandson of António Sarmento de Sousa Horta Osório. Married to Ana Cristina Costa Pinto Horta Osório.

=== Education ===
António Horta-Osório holds a degree in Business Management and Administration from the Portuguese Catholic University in Lisbon, an MBA from INSEAD, and an Advanced Management Program from Harvard Business School. He has been awarded honorary doctorates by the University of Edinburgh, the University of Bath, the University of Warwick, the University of Birmingham, and the Portuguese Catholic University.

== Career ==
=== Early career ===
In 1987 Horta-Osório joined Citibank in Portugal, where he became vice president and head of Capital Markets until 1990. During this period, he also taught at the Catholic University of Portugal, where he was an assistant professor, and a guest professor from 1992–1996. He was also a guest professor in the Superior Course of Banking Management at the Portuguese Bank Training Institute (IFB), from 1988 to 1994.

In 1991 he joined Goldman Sachs, working in their corporate finance division, in New York City and London, from 1991 to 1993. That year, he was invited by Emilio Botín and Ana Botín to join the Santander Group and set up Banco Santander de Negócios in Portugal (BSNP), of which he became CEO. From 1995 to 2003, he was president of the Association of Alumni of INSEAD in Portugal. In 1998 he became a member of the INSEAD Portuguese Council, and from 2003 to 2007 he was the chairman.

In 1997, Horta-Osório moved to Brazil, where he initiated Santander’s retail activities in the country, purchasing two retail banks and merging them into Banco Santander Brasil, of which he became CEO (1997–1999) and chairman (1997–2000). From December 1997, he also became the chairman of Banco Santander Portugal. With the 1999–2000 agreement between António Champalimaud, the Santander Group and the Caixa Geral de Depósitos, the Santander Group became the owner of Banco Totta & Açores and Crédito Predial Português, adding these to Banco Santander de Negócios and Banco Santander Portugal. Following this, the Group changed its name to Banco Santander Totta.

In 2000, he became chief executive of Banco Santander Totta in Portugal. He also became executive vice president of Banco Santander in Spain and a member of its management committee. He joined Abbey National as a non-executive director in November 2004. In August 2006, he moved to the UK, and became CEO of Abbey and its successor Santander UK. In 2006, he became chairman of Santander Totta in Portugal. In 2008, he led the integration into the Santander Group of the British building societies Bradford & Bingley and Alliance & Leicester.

Horta-Osório was appointed as a non-executive director to the Court of the Bank of England in June 2009, relinquishing this position in February 2011, as he became CEO of Lloyds Banking Group on 1 March 2011. Horta-Osorio is currently a non-executive director of EXOR N.V., Fundação Champalimaud and Sociedade Francisco Manuel dos Santos in Portugal, a member of the Board of Stichting INPAR. He also serves on the Confederation of British Industry (CBI) President’s Committee and is Chairman of the Wallace Collection.

=== Lloyds Banking Group ===
In January 2011 he joined Lloyds Banking Group as an executive director, becoming CEO on 1 March 2011.

In November 2011, he went on temporary leave due to exhaustion, which the Evening Standard called the most high-profile sick leave in the City. The following month, he announced that he was ready to return to work. In January 2012, he cited the impact that his leave of absence had on the company as the reason that he did not wish to receive a bonus for 2011, and said "As chief executive, I believe my bonus entitlement should reflect the performance of the group".

Under his leadership, the bank's financial performance was turned around. It returned to profitability, slimming down to focus on domestic lending and to meet tougher regulatory requirements on the amount of capital it holds. Lloyds started down the road to full private ownership, with the Government reducing its stake in September 2013 and March 2014 respectively. In 2014, Horta-Osório saw his pay increase more than 50 percent to £11.5m as Lloyds returned to profit. Lloyds completed its return to private ownership in May 2017 with c.£900m above the original stake being repaid to the government.

In the aftermath of the Brexit referendum, Horta-Osório sought to allay fears the bank would shift operations abroad as other UK banks had announced. He said "We have no plans to move jobs to Luxembourg, or anywhere else in Europe, as a result of the UK’s decision to leave the European Union…But the nature of our business, and our UK focus, means the direct impact on our business is less compared to our peers".

In 2017, Lloyds' statutory profit increased by 24% to £5.3bn in the year and it paid out the largest dividend in its history (£2.3bn) including a share buyback of £1bn. It also completed the acquisition of MBNA (1 June) and announced the acquisition of Zurich's UK workplace pensions and savings business (12 October).

In July 2020 Horta-Osório announced that he would stand down as chief executive of Lloyds Banking Group by summer 2021. Charlie Nunn, formerly of HSBC, was named as his successor. Horta-Osório left at the end of April 2021.

=== Credit Suisse ===
In December 2020, Credit Suisse announced that, from April 2021, Horta-Osório would succeed Urs Rohner as its chairman. Rohner described himself as "extremely happy" with the appointment. Horta-Osório is the first non-Swiss chairman in the bank's history. It was reported that he would move to Switzerland to take up the role, which he began by purchasing Credit Suisse stock worth $1.2 million as a sign of confidence in the group. He resigned in January 2022 after an internal investigation into his breach of Covid rules in the UK and Switzerland, and was succeeded by Axel Lehmann.

=== BIAL and other positions ===
Currently, Horta-Osório is Chairman of the Board of Directors of the pharmaceutical company BIAL; Non-Executive Director of the Champalimaud Foundation, Stichting/Enable INPAR, José de Mello Capital, SA, and Teya Holding; and Senior Advisor to Mediobanca, Cerberus Capital Management, and Precision Capital.

== Other activities ==
- Institute of International Finance (IFF), Member of the Board

== Honours and awards ==
=== Portuguese Orders ===
- Grand-Cross of the Commercial Class of Order of Entrepreneurial Merit (June 2014)

=== Foreign Orders ===
- Commander of the Spanish Royal Order of Civil Merit (August 1998)
- Commander of the Brazilian Order of the Southern Cross (October 1998)
- Commander by Number of the Spanish Royal Order of Isabella the Catholic (June 2009)
- Knight of Grace and Devotion of the Sovereign Military Hospitaller Order of Saint John of Jerusalem, of Rhodes and of Malta (2010)
- Knight Bachelor for services to financial services and voluntary services to mental healthcare and culture (2021 Birthday Honours)
- Freeman of the City of London (2018)

=== Awards ===
==== Honorary Doctorates ====
- Catholic University of Portugal (February 2022)
- University of Edinburgh (June 2011)
- University of Bath (July 2012)
- University of Warwick (2015)
- University of Birmingham (2019)

==== Other awards ====
- Foreign Policy Association Medal (2019)
- British American Business Corporate Citizenship Award (2019)
- INSEAD Alumni Achievement Award (2019)

== Personal life ==
Horta-Osório and his wife Ana have three children, and live in Chelsea, London. He is a keen scuba diver, and enjoys playing tennis and chess.

Horta-Osório supported the UK remaining in the European Union.

== Controversies ==
In August 2016, Horta-Osório issued an apology in an email sent to Lloyd Banking Group's 75,000 staff for reported transgressions in his personal life while travelling abroad. He clarified that there was no financial misdeed, as he paid all his expenses personally, and indicated that he did not intend to leave the group as a consequence. He wrote: "I deeply regret being the cause of so much adverse publicity and the damage that has been done to the group’s reputation." His actions were reported to have been in breach of a code of personal responsibility for Lloyds staff that he had introduced himself.

In December 2021, a preliminary investigation by Credit Suisse had found that Mr Horta-Osorio had breached Covid-19 rules. He attended the Wimbledon tennis finals in July 2021 at a time when the UK's Covid-19 restrictions required him to be in quarantine. Mr Horta-Osorio also breached Swiss Covid restrictions when, according to Reuters, he flew into the country on 28 November but left on 1 December 2020. Swiss rules meant he should have quarantined for 10 days upon his arrival.

== Mental-health philanthropy ==
Horta-Osório has been public in describing how restoring Lloyds Bank's fortunes "almost shattered" his mental health and he has become a prominent campaigner for employers to support their employees with mental-health challenges, and thus shrug off its stigma.

At Lloyds he oversaw the training of thousands of mental-health first-aiders, while he and around 200 other senior executives underwent a 12-month “optimal leadership resilience programme”, devised with his psychiatrist, Dr Stephen Pereira. Since January 2017, Lloyds Banking Group’s partnership with Mental Health UK has raised £11m and enabled 14,000 volunteering hours and 40 support groups. The partnership also runs a Mental Health and Money Advice service.

Horta-Osório was also involved, with Prince William, in the launch of Mind’s Mental Health at Work “gateway” in 2018; and in Lloyds’ membership of the City Mental Health Alliance. He has been widely praised for his campaign against the workplace taboo surrounding mental-health issues; Simon Blake OBE, chief executive of Mental Health First Aid (MHFA) England, described his openness about his own problems as “inspiring”.

In 2020, Lloyds Banking Group’s work to raise awareness of mental health earned it a Gold award in the Business Disability Forum’s Disability Standard.

== Arts ==
In 2015 Horta-Osório was made chairman of the Wallace Collection. In 2019, during his tenure, the gallery eased its traditional policy of not loaning any items, and began both to make and receive temporary loans of selected works – for example, lending Titian’s "Perseus and Andromeda" for the National Gallery’s 2020 exhibition, Titian: Love, Desire, Death. The collection’s director, Xavier Bray, hailed the change as a "revolution" which was "like bringing fresh air to the collection and just making it live again". Horta-Osório’s chairmanship, a prime ministerial appointment, was renewed in 2019.

Horta-Osório is also a significant collector of Portuguese art, particularly works of art made under Portuguese patronage in maritime Asia from the 16th to the 18th century. The collection includes objects created in China, Japan and India (especially Gujarat), often in rare materials such as tortoiseshell, mother-of-pearl and ivory and rock crystal. It also features a number of early chess sets.
