= Caja Rural =

Caja rural in Spanish refers to an agricultural cooperative bank. It may also refer to two separate agricultural cooperative banking groups in Spain and/or to their individual member entities:

- Grupo Caja Rural
- Cajamar Cooperative Group
