= BANIF =

BANIF may refer to:

- Banif Financial Group a Portuguese financial services company originally from Funchal
- Banco BANIF, S.A, a Spanish private banking institution, which is a subsidiary of the Santander Group
