= Cajamar =

Cajamar may refer to:

- Cajamar, São Paulo, a locality in Brazil
- Cajamar Cooperative Group, a cooperative banking group in Spain
