= O Século de Joanesburgo =

Defunct South African newspaper for the Portuguese community

O Século de Joanesburgo (The Century of Johannesburg) was a South African weekly newspaper based in Johannesburg catering the Portuguese community. It was one of the oldest Lusophone papers printed in Southern Africa as a whole. After a period of uncertainties in 2020, publication shifted entirely online, before shutting down in February 2021.

== History ==
The newspaper was founded in 1963 and, by 1974, was already owned by O Diário de Lourenço Marques, which was a newspaper from Portuguese Mozambique. The newspaper was self-sufficient for a long time; in 1981, it even owned its own printing factory, one of the largest of the time in South Africa. Varela Afonso was its director since 1974. Still in 1974, it became the first Portuguese diaspora paper to use computers in its newsroom. By 2009, the owner of the newspaper was Madeiran banker Horácio Roque, president of the now-defunct Banif bank and owner of the Lusoglobo travel agency.

On 25 February 2020, Paula Ramos dos Santos Caetano (wife of former owner Horácio Roque, who died in 2010), president of Século Investment Holding, the parent company of the newspaper, announced plans to branch out into the Portuguese market. Readership in South Africa was dwindling as the Lusophone community was speaking less Portuguese there. Moreover, the Portuguese community was dwindling due to immigration largely to English-speaking countries. Another challenge was the online sector, as the website only had 1,500 weekly views worldwide.

In July 2020, the print edition of O Século de Joanesburgo was suspended due to cost issues with paper facing the then-ongoing pandemic and moved entirely to its website. Four of its eight staff were fired and advertisers fled. One staff member reported that the company could not pay its staff and its yearly bonuses on time. In December, the owner rejected a €2,500 proposal from the Portuguese government to save it, which she thought was a low amount of money considering the general crisis of the time.

The last issue was published on 8 February 2021. The virus infected one of its staff and was hospitalised by April. Eduardo Ouana, who got infected at the time of its suspension, died on 8 May.

== Circulation ==
As of February 2020, shortly before the suspension of the print edition, it had a circulation of 24–30,000 issues. The newspaper was circulated in several countries of the region: in addition to South Africa, it was also distributed in Angola, Mozambique, Zimbabwe, Namibia and Swaziland.

== Archives ==
The Cape Town campus of the National Library of South Africa holds archives of the paper from August 1971 to December 2010.
