= Crédito Agrícola Group =

Cooperative banking group in Portugal

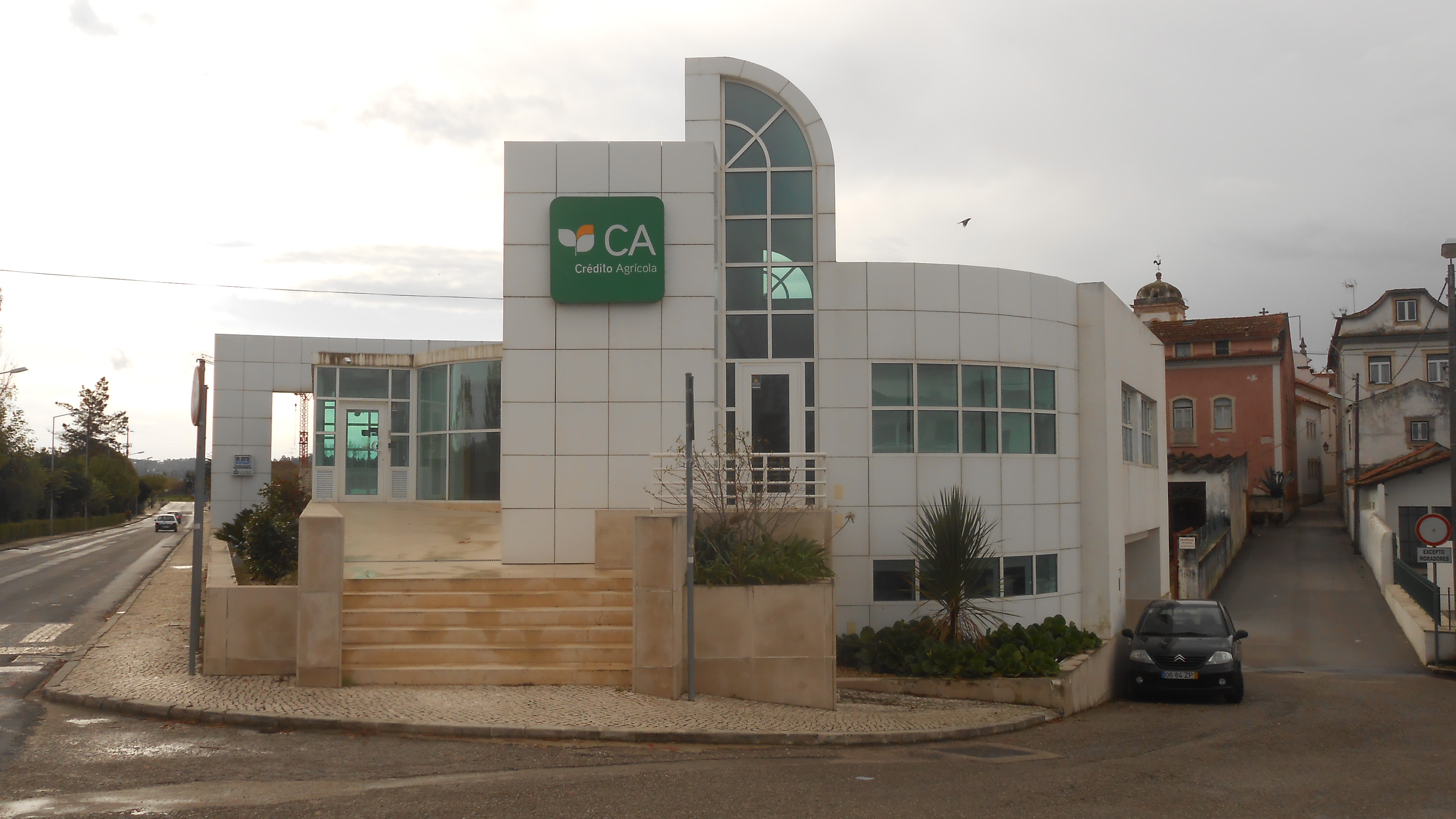
A Crédito Agrícola branch in Soure

The Crédito Agrícola Group (CA Group) is a cooperative banking group in Portugal. It is centered on the Caixa Central de Crédito Agrícola Mútuo (CCCAM) in Lisbon and includes 67 additional local agricultural credit cooperatives (Portuguese: Caixa de Crédito Agrícola Mútuo) as of 1 September 2025. It had total consolidated assets of €27.3 billion as of end-2024.

== Overview ==
The Portuguese system of local agricultural cooperatives traces its roots to legislation of 1 March 1911 adopted under the leadership of minister Manuel de Brito Camacho, based on preparatory work that had started before the 1910 Revolution, and complemented by further legislation in 1914 and 1919. This initiative was in turn inspired by the pioneering initiatives of Friedrich Wilhelm Raiffeisen in 19th-century Germany. In 1929, the local agricultural cooperative banks came under oversight of the state-owned Caixa Geral de Depósitos (CGD).

In 1978 in the wake of the Carnation Revolution, the local cooperatives established a national representative body, the National Federation of Mutual Agricultural Credit Banks or FENACAM (Portuguese: Federação Nacional das Caixas de Crédito Agrícola Mútuo). Subsequent legislation made them independent from the CGD in 1982, and established instead the CCCAM as dedicated central financial entity on 20 June 1984. In 1987, this framework was complemented by the creation of a Mutual Agricultural Credit Guarantee Fund (Fundo de Garantia do Crédito Agrícola Mútuo, FGCAM). On 1 January 2000, the FGCAM was transformed into a mutual support arrangement under private law known as the Mutual Agricultural Credit Support Fund (Fundo de Assistência do Crédito Agrícola Mútuo, FACAM).

By 2020, the Crédito Agrícola Group had the most extensive network in Portugal with 637 local branches, ahead of CGD (543), Banco Comercial Português (478), and Banco Santander Portugal (443 branches). The group also maintains branches in Geneva, Luxembourg, and Paris to serve the Portuguese diaspora.

The CCCAM is fully-owned by the local agricultural credit cooperatives, and in turn owns most or all of equity in the group's specialized subsidiaries such as those in insurance, asset management, or IT services.

A handful of local agricultural cooperatives in Portugal have remained outside of the Crédito Agrícola Group. As of 2021, that group consisted of the Caixa de Crédito Agrícola Mútuo in Bombarral, Chamusca, Leiria, Mafra, and Torres Vedras.

== See also ==
- Grupo Caja Rural
- Cajamar Cooperative Group
- Solventia Cooperative Group
- List of banks in Portugal
- List of banks in the euro area
- List of European cooperative banks
