= Solventia Cooperative Group =

Banking group in Spain

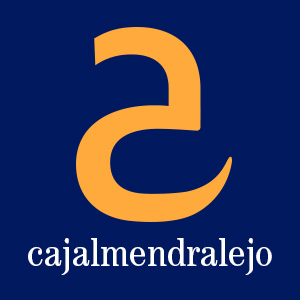
Logo of Cajalmendralejo, also used by the broader Solventia group

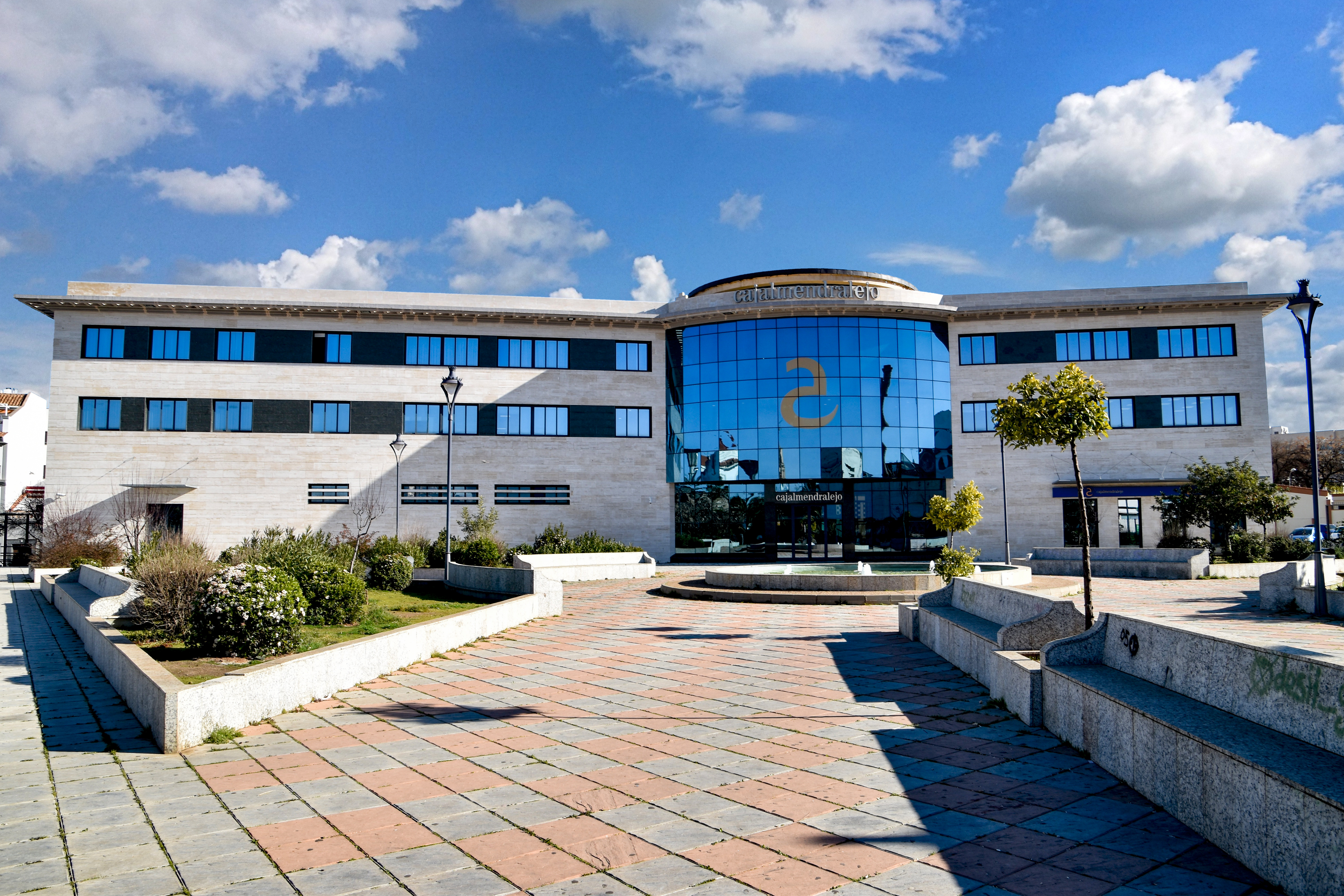
Group head office in Almendralejo

The Solventia Cooperative Group (Spanish: Grupo Cooperativo Solventia) is a banking group in Spain, created in 2011 as part of the process of consolidation of the country's agricultural cooperative banks (Spanish: cajas rurales) that also led to the formation of Grupo Caja Rural and Cajamar Cooperative Group. It is centered on Caja Rural de Almendralejo (also known as Cajalmendralejo) based since 1903 in Almendralejo, Extremadura. Like other cooperative banking groups, Solventia is managed on a highly decentralized basis.

As of early 2026, Solventia had operations in Andalusia, Extremadura, Castile and León, the Community of Madrid, and the Valencian Community.

== Overview ==
Solventia was formed on 30 June 2011 as a Spanish Sistema Institucional de Protección (SIP, a different arrangement from institutional protection schemes under EU law), with Cajalmendralejo as its central entity. The grouping initially consisted of six entities, namely Cajalmendralejo and the following five other cajas rurales, all located in Andalusia:

- Caja Rural Nuestra Madre del Sol, in Adamuz
- Caja Rural de Baena Nuestra Señora de Guadalupe, in Baena
- Caja Rural de Cañete de las Torres Nuestra Señora del Campo, in Cañete de las Torres
- Caja Rural de Nueva Carteya, in Nueva Carteya
- Caja Rural de Utrera, in Utrera

Three additional entities joined in the early 2020s:

- Caja Rural La Vall de San Isidro, in La Vall d'Uixó, Valencian Community, added to the SIP on 27 July 2021;
- Banco de Depósitos, S.A., a small commercial bank established 1975 in Madrid, purchased by Cajalmendralejo on 12 January 2022;
- Caja Rural de Benicarló, in Benicarló, Valencian Community, added to the SIP on 24 January 2022.

As of end-2023, the Solventia Cooperative Group had total assets of €4.15 billion Cajalmendralejo alone had total assets of €2.6 billion as of 2021.

== See also ==
- Crédito Agrícola Group
- List of European cooperative banks
- List of banks in Spain
