= Axel Lehmann =

Swiss banker

Axel P. Lehmann
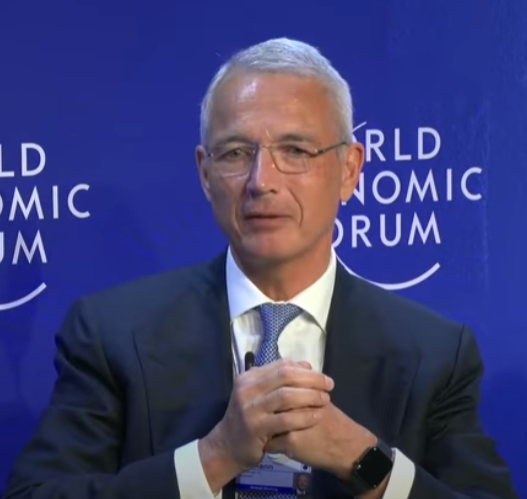
- Lehmann in 2022
- Born: 23 March 1959 (age 66)
- Education: University of St. Gallen (MBA, PhD)
- Title: Former chairman, Credit Suisse
- Term: January 2022-June 2023
- Predecessor: António Horta-Osório

Axel P. Lehmann (born 1959) is a Swiss business executive. From January 2022 to June 2023, he was chairman of the Credit Suisse Group.

== Early life ==
Lehmann was born in 1959, and is a Swiss citizen. He earned an MBA and a PhD from the University of St. Gallen. He is an adjunct professor at the university.

== Career ==
Lehmann worked for 20 years in insurance, briefly at Swiss Life before joining Zurich Insurance Group, where he was chief risk officer from 2009 and 2015. He was a non-executive director of UBS from 2009 to 2015 before joining the bank full-time, and in 2016 he appointed its chief operating officer. He was president of UBS Switzerland from 2018 and 2021. In October 2021, Lehmann became a board member of Credit Suisse as head of its risk committee.

In January 2022, Lehmann succeeded António Horta-Osório as chairman of Credit Suisse after he resigned due to repeated breaches of COVID regulations.

In April 2023, Lehmann was re-elected as chair after he apologised to investors at the bank's final AGM. Lehmann stepped down with the legal merger of Credit Suisse and UBS in June 2023.
