= Banco BPI =

Portuguese private bank, founded in 1981

Banco BPI S.A.
- Type: Subsidiary
- Industry: Financial services
- Founded: 6 October 1981
- Headquarters: Porto, Portugal
- Key people: Fernando Ulrich (CEO), Artur Santos Silva (Chairman)
- Products: Retail and investment banking, insurance, asset management, private equity
- Revenue: €1.181 billion (2015)
- Net income: €236.4 million (2015)
- AUM: €17.91 billion (end 2015)
- Total assets: €41.913 billion (June 2025)
- Total equity: €2.835 billion (end 2015)
- Number of employees: 4,354 (June 2025)
- Parent: CaixaBank (100%)
- Website: www.bancobpi.pt

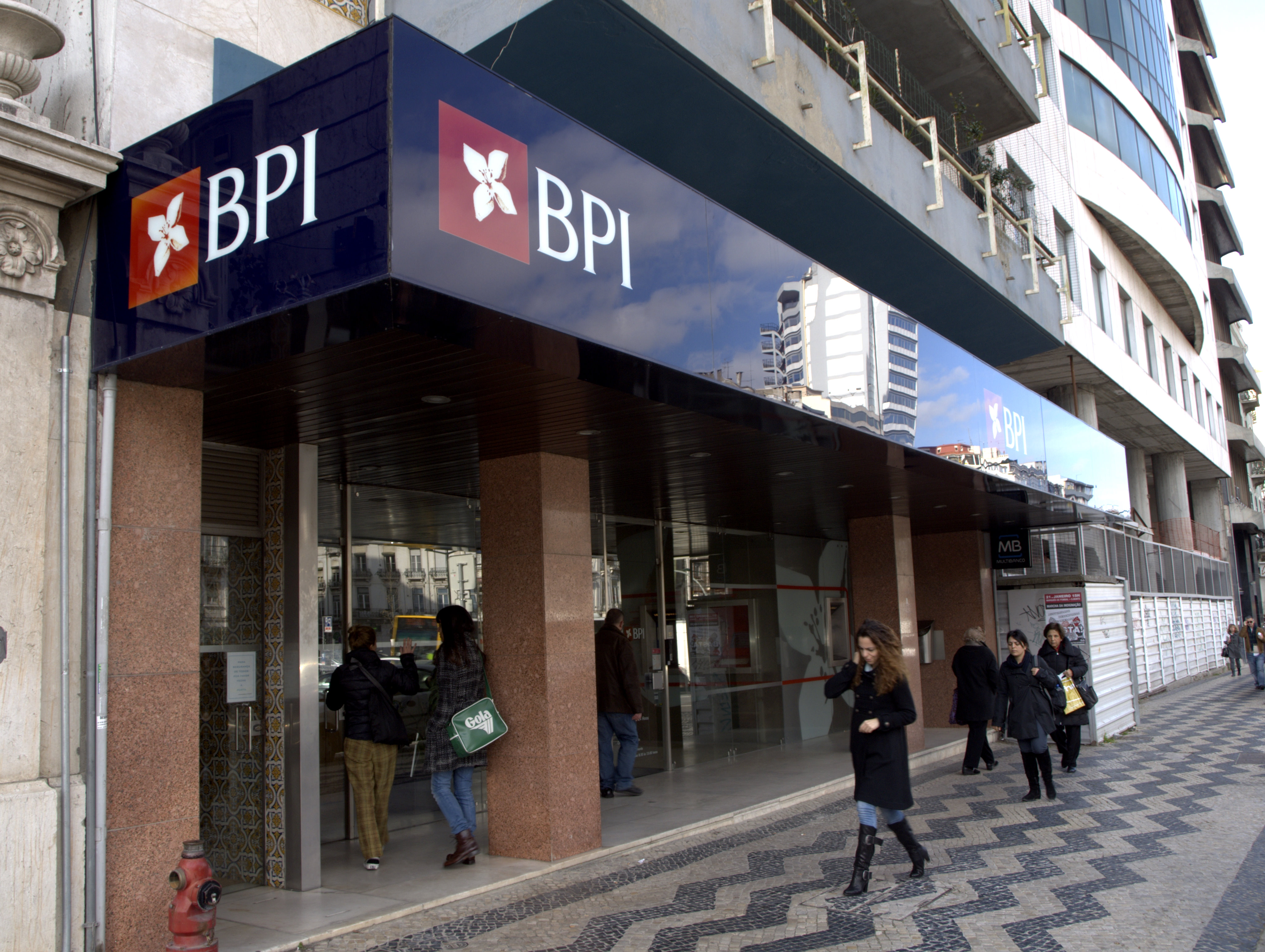
BPI branch at Praça Duque de Saldanha, Lisbon

Banco BPI, formerly Banco Português de Investimento (Portuguese pronunciation: [ˈbɐ̃ku puɾtuˈɣeʒ ðɨ ĩvɨʃtiˈmẽtu], "Portuguese Investment Bank"), is a Portuguese private investment bank, currently owned by finance multinational CaixaBank. Founded in 1981, it runs the banking business with companies, institutional and private clients. It is the third largest private Portuguese financial group with assets of €112.9 billion (in 2009). Chairman and CEO is Fernando Ulrich. The bank is headquartered in Porto.

The commercial banking group Banco BPI has more than 1.8 million customers, individuals, businesses and institutions. Through its multi-channel distribution network with 674 branches, 30 investment centers and branches, the bank specializes in home loans through a network of outside companies. The bank is primarily active in Portugal and Spain, Angola and Mozambique. In Angola, BPI is the market leader in corporate banking and its activity reached a 25% market share on its 50.1% stake in Banco de Fomento Angola (BFA) with 750,000 customers in December 2010. In Mozambique, the BPI maintains a 30 percent stake in the bank BCI Fomento.

On 25 October 2007, BPI offered a merger proposal with Millennium BCP, the largest private bank of Portugal. However, the board of BCP rejected the proposal.

Until 2017 the bank's shares were listed in the Euronext Lisbon's PSI-20 stock index. CaixaBank raised its stake from 45% to 84.5% in 2017, took the bank private, and then acquired all the remaining shares the following year. As of December 2018, 100 percent of the shares are held by the Spanish bank CaixaBank.

== Logo ==
The logo represents an orange blossom. Oranges are a symbol of the Portuguese economic expansion, as some countries had contact with the Portuguese traders involving the fruit; in some languages such as Arabic, Ladin, Albanian, Turkish and Romanian, the word orange is similar to the word Portugal. When it was launched, it was the most expensive logo design of a Portuguese company.

== See also ==
- List of banks in Portugal
