= Fernando Ulrich =

Portuguese economist and banking administrator (born 1952)

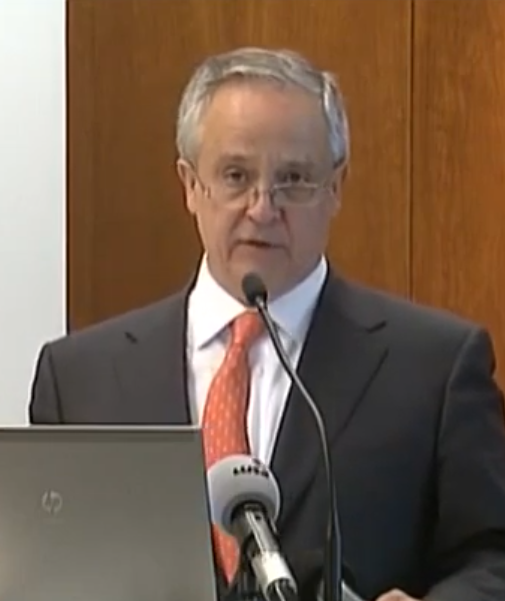
Fernando Ulrich

Fernando Maria Costa Duarte Ulrich (born 26 April 1952 in Lisbon) is a Portuguese economist and banking administrator. He has been the chief executive officer of Banco Português de Investimento (BPI) since 2004.

== Early life and background ==
The Ulrich family, whose members used to traditionally deal with banking and architecture, was originally German from Hamburg, Holy Roman Empire, but established themselves in Portugal during the mid-18th century. After an invitation of the Marquis of Pombal they worked in the reconstruction of Lisbon after the 1755 Lisbon earthquake.

Born in 1952 in Santa Isabel, Lisbon, Fernando Ulrich was the first child and only son of João Jorge de Melo Ulrich and Maria Isabel Buzaglo Costa Duarte (of maternal Sephardi Jewish descent), and grandson of both an administrator of the Banco de Portugal and a broker and insurance professional. Young Fernando attended the Business Management Course at the Instituto Superior de Economia de Lisboa of the Technical University of Lisbon from 1969 to 1974, but he did not graduate.

== Political and financial career ==
Fernando Ulrich was Deputy Manager of Sociedade Portuguesa de Investimentos (SPI) from 1983 to 1985 and Chief of the Cabinet of the Portuguese Minister of Finance from 1981 to 1983, when Francisco Pinto Balsemão was the head of the Government of Portugal. He was among the Portuguese Delegation to the OECD, from 1975 to 1979 and was Head of the Financial Markets Unit of the weekly newspaper Expresso, founded by Francisco Pinto Balsemão, from 1973 to 1974. He has been a member of the Board of Directors of Impresa since 2000, and non-executive Director of Allianz Portugal since 1999. He served as a Member on the Board of Directors of PT Multimedia-Serviços de Telecomunicações e Multimedia, SGPS, S.A. from August 2002 to September 2004. He served as a Director of Portugal Telecom SGPS SA from 1998 to July 2005. He served as an Executive Director of BPI-Banco Português de Investimento, SA from 1985 to 1989. He also served as Member of the Adviser Board of CIP (The Portuguese Industrial Confederation) from 2002 to 2004. He was Member of the Secretariat for the External Economic Cooperation of the Ministry of Foreign Affairs from 1979 to 1980. He served as a Director of Semapa - Sociedade de Investimento e Gestao SGPS SA until February 2009.

== Family ==
He married in Cascais on 8 November 1974 Isabel Diana de Bettencourt de Melo e Castro, born in Cascais on 16 February 1954, daughter of Engineer José Lobo de Almeida de Melo e Castro, 11th Count of as Galveias and 2nd Viscount of a Lourinhã, of the Counts of de Avilez and Viscounts of o Reguengo, and wife Daisy Maria Cohen de Bettencourt de Vasconcelos Correia e Ávila of the Counts of Correia de Bettencourt and of the Viscounts of de Bettencourt, of Sephardi Jewish, Spanish and Italian descent. The couple had three children:

- Sofia de Melo e Castro Ulrich (born 2 May 1975)
- Ana Margarida de Melo e Castro Ulrich (born 19 May 1980), married at Vale do Guiso on 9 May 2009 to her half second cousin Joaquim da Cunha Reis Ferreira, second of three sons of Luís Bernardo Ulrich Ferreira and Carlota Isabel Maria do Carmo Xavier de Noronha da Cunha Reis
- João de Melo e Castro Ulrich (born 12 January 1984)
