= Horácio Roque =

Portuguese financier and businessman (1944 - 2010)

Horácio da Silva Roque (12 April 1944 – 19 May 2010) was a Portuguese financier and businessman, who founded the Banco Internacional do Funchal (BANIF) in 1988.

Horácio Roque was born in Oleiros, Oleiros, on the 12th of April, 1944. At the age of 14 he left on a ship to Angola, where his older sister already lived. Roque started his first business, a bar in Portuguese Angola, then a colonial possession of Portugal, when he was just 17 years old. He gradually built up his wealth from a series of business ventures throughout southern Africa. In addition to the Banco Internacional do Funchal (BANIF), which is headquartered in Funchal, Madeira, Roque's assets included real estate and insurance holdings throughout Portugal, North America and South America.

== Early life ==
After having been employed at the Pérola de São Paulo charcuterie, owned by his brother-in-law, and at the Palladium café, two Portuguese coffee farmers proposed to him a partnership in the Munich brewery. Horacio Roque was 18 years old. Remaining as a partner in the brewery, the teen hired a teacher to take private lessons in order to continue his studies, and his name was Viriato. Horacio Roque proposed opening a real school. The business proved to be so profitable that two years later he opened the Universal College, two institutes and another one with practical courses. It got more members and also launched the Verney school, in Mozambique. The already entrepreneur expanded to other areas. He began importing products of various kinds at retail to sell all over the Angolan territory — he sold everything: he started with wigs from Hong Kong, then German beauty products, then wine and even medications.

Ten years after arriving in Angola, however, he faced the first problems. When the third school opened, the enrollment of students fell short of expectations and ended up getting into debt with banks and friends. But in 1967 he turned around, carrying out a survey of students with difficulties. He contacted them one by one and they appeared by the hundreds. It was enough to pay off debts and return to business, expanding into real estate and buying his first luxury restaurant, Farol Velho, on the island of Luanda. Horácio Roque believed that Angola would continue to develop without stopping. "It was the biggest mistake of my life," he later confessed. In 1975, his wife left with her daughter for Johannesburg. The businessman stayed until 1976. The schools ended up closing, leaving the restaurant, the favorite of MPLA and government generals, with whom he maintained good relations. He left for South Africa swearing he would not return for the next 10 years. (He only returned to rescue his wife, a UNITA supporter, imprisoned by MPLA forces.)

For a year, the entrepreneur traveled the world looking for the next business and not knowing exactly what he was going to do. Finally, he settled in South Africa, where close to a million Portuguese lived. With the right contacts, he started investing in multiple areas: insurance, real estate, clinical analysis. He acquired the newspaper O Século in Johannesburg and a printing press. Most of these businesses still operate today, under the leadership of his second wife, Paula Caetano. He also took advantage of the shortage of products in Mozambique and began to export essential goods to the former Lourenço Marques.

Meanwhile, he met Joe Berardo, a Madeiran who had emigrated to South Africa at the age of 19 and who made a fortune in gold mining, among other businesses. They became inseparable. Every Thursday they met at the Academia do Bacalhau, a restricted club created by Durval Marques, president of Bank of Lisbon and South Africa, who wanted to retain businessmen who were getting rich in South Africa. With the help of Joe Berardo and Durval Marques, Horácio Roque financed a network of clinical laboratories that he later sold to a multinational pharmaceutical company. He opened an insurance brokerage, a travel agency for the Portuguese who traveled frequently to Portugal and Latin America, and a real estate agency that sold houses in Lisbon and the Algarve to immigrants.

In the 1980s, the businessman returned to Portugal, and with Joe Berardo saved the Caixa Económica do Funchal from bankruptcy, transforming it into Banif. On January 15, 1988, he became chairman of the bank's board of directors.

== Politics ==
Well-connected, in 1982 Horácio Roque became a pivotal figure in the release of UNITA's Portuguese political prisoners in Jamba. On April 5, a delegation of 22 people boarded a military plane towards the border near Jamba. Despite never having been involved in politics, Horácio Roque was always a skilful negotiator, with good relations with power, namely with Jonas Savimbi, thanks to his wife Fátima Roque, very close to UNITA, with the apartheid regime itself and the Portuguese government. One of the last episodes in Africa told in his biography is the visit of João Soares to Angola: "Zedu (José Eduardo dos Santos) invites me to go there to give a message to Savimbi, to ask him to calm down. Savimbi also invites me. I didn't tell anyone I was going," he recalled.

He was awarded the rank of Commander of the Order of Infante D. Henrique on March 18, 1989. The King of Spain, D. Juan Carlos I, distinguished him with the degree of Commander of the Order of Isabel the Catholic.

He was Honorary Consul of Panama in Portugal, whose President of the Republic awarded him, in 1998, the National Decoration of the Order of Vasco Núñez de Balboa.

== Family ==
He married twice, the first with Maria de Fátima Henriques da Silva de Moura, whom he divorced in 2000, marrying the second time with, Paula Caetano.

After his death, and despite the divorce, his ex-wife tried to inherit half of his fortune, to the detriment of the couple's two daughters, Maria Teresa Henriques da Silva de Moura Roque (1971), President of the Superior Advisory Board of Banif, wife of also businessman Pietro Saviotti dal Fabbro, from whom Lorenzo Roque dal Fabbro (2004) and Bianca Roque dal Fabbro (2006) were born, and Cristina Henriques da Silva de Moura Roque (1978), anthropologist.

His stepmother Paula Caetano also tried to inherit part of the fortune, which was also denied by her stepdaughters.

== Death ==
Horácio Roque died of a stroke on 19 May 2010, at the Hospital of São José, at São José, in Lisbon, Portugal. He was 66 years old.

== Net Worth ==
Net Worth: $1.4 billion
