= Banco Invest =

- Native name: Banco Invest S.A.
- Industry: Financial services
- Founded: 1997
- Headquarters: Avenida Engenheiro Duarte Pacheco, Torre 1- 11º Andar, 1070-101 Lisbon, Portugal
- Total assets: €1,061 billion
- Website: www.bancoinvest.pt

Banco Invest is an investing bank headquartered in Lisbon, Portugal and provides corporate finance for mergers and acquisitions, capital markets, partnerships, and restructuring. Banco Invest specializes in the management of Savings and Investments of its Clients, offering a global and diversified set of products and services.

Business areas are:

- Asset Management
- Brokerage
- Specialised Credit
- Financial Services and Institutional Custody
- Treasury and Capital Markets
- Invest Corporate Finance
- Private Banking

The original name was the Banco Alves Ribeiro from February 1997, the recent name is from October 2005.

== See also ==
- List of banks in Portugal
