= Banco Montepio =

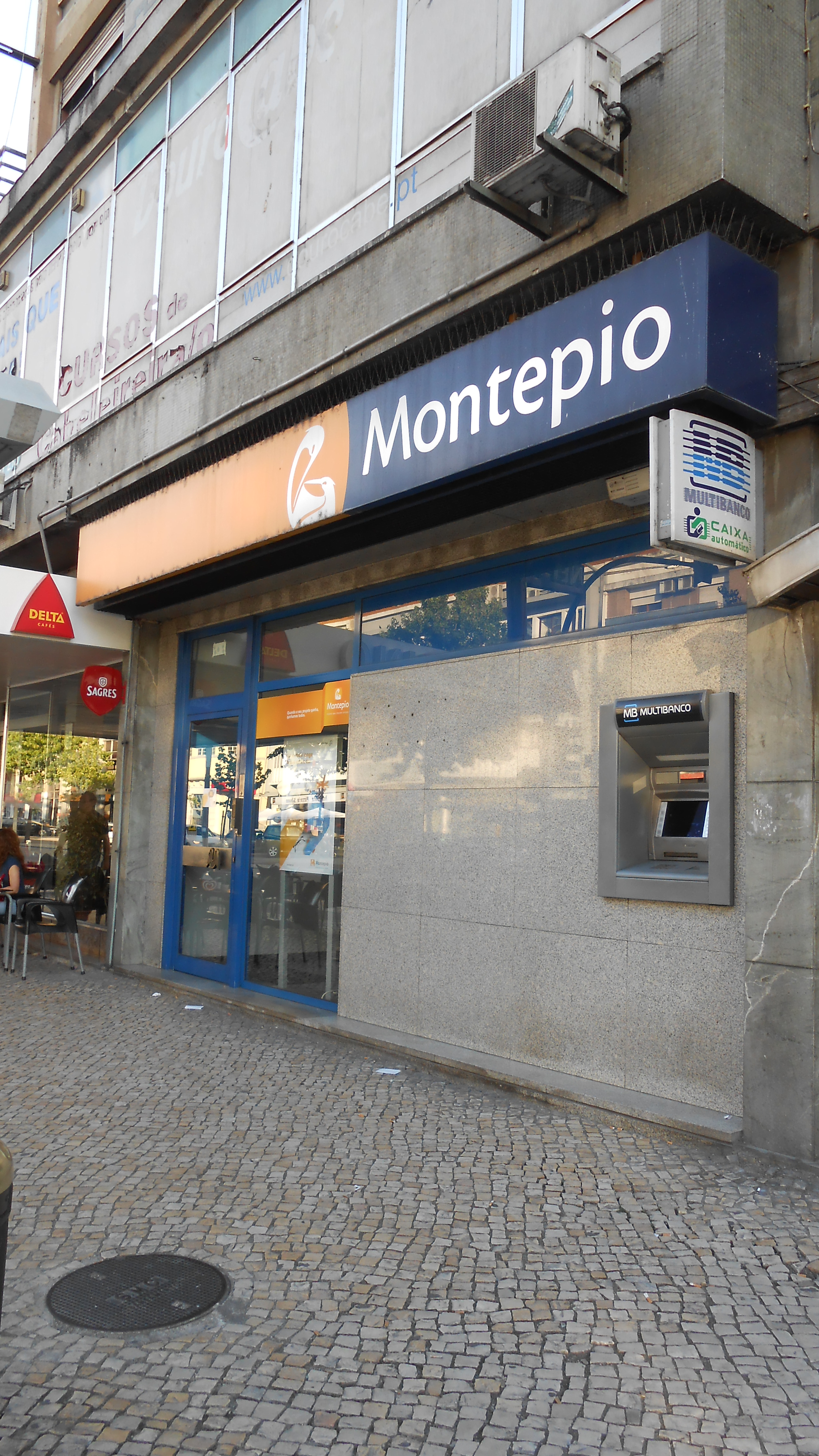
- Branch at Coimbra
- Type: Privately Held
- Industry: Banking
- Founded: 1844
- Headquarters: Lisbon, Portugal
- Products: Retail Banking
- Total assets: €18,902 billion (Q1 2025)
- Website: bancomontepio.pt

Banco Montepio (Portuguese pronunciation: [mõtɨˈpiu]), formerly Montepio Geral, legally incorporated as Caixa Económica Montepio Geral, Caixa Económica Bancária, S.A. is a Portuguese mutual savings organization, better known for its banking activity. Banco Montepio was established in 1844 and is headquartered in Lisbon.

The Montepio group is headed by the Montepio Geral - Associação Mutualista and includes the Banco Montepio (banking holding), the Lusitania (insurance company), the Lusitania Vida (life insurances), the Fundação Montepio (social solidarity foundation), the Futuro (pension fund management), the Montepio Gestão de Activos (investment fund management), the Residências Montepio (Senior residences management) and the Leacock (insurance broker company).

It served as the official jersey sponsor of the Portuguese national basketball team at the 2011 EuroBasket in Lithuania.

On 20 February 2019, Montepio released its new brand and became known as Banco Montepio. In addition to the brand, the logo also was renovated: it now features just one pelican, and not two as it was previously.

Banco Montepio has more than 200 branches nationwide and representation in France, Germany, Switzerland, Canada and the United States of America, in the cities of Paris, Frankfurt, Geneva, Toronto and Newark, respectively.

== History ==
Montepio was delisted from the Euronext stock exchange on 15 September 2017.

== See also ==
- List of banks in the euro area
- List of banks in Portugal
