= Crédito Predial Português =

Crédito Predial Português (literally Portuguese Land Credit) was a Portuguese financial organisation that was acquired by Banco Santander and became part of the group. The institution was created at a time when, due to a change in the laws on the creation of public limited companies, 46 banks were created between 1863 and 1876. Its initial capital was equally owned by French and Portuguese people, as were its first managers.

The bank was absorbed by Banco Santander Portugal in 2004.
