= Cajamar Cooperative Group =

Bank in Spain

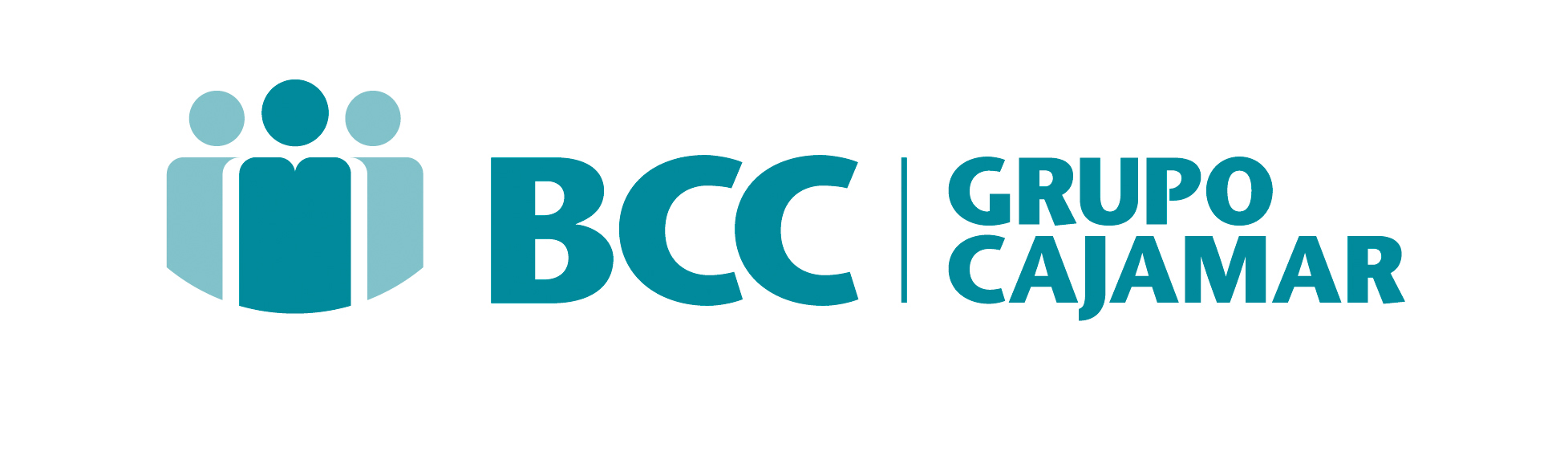

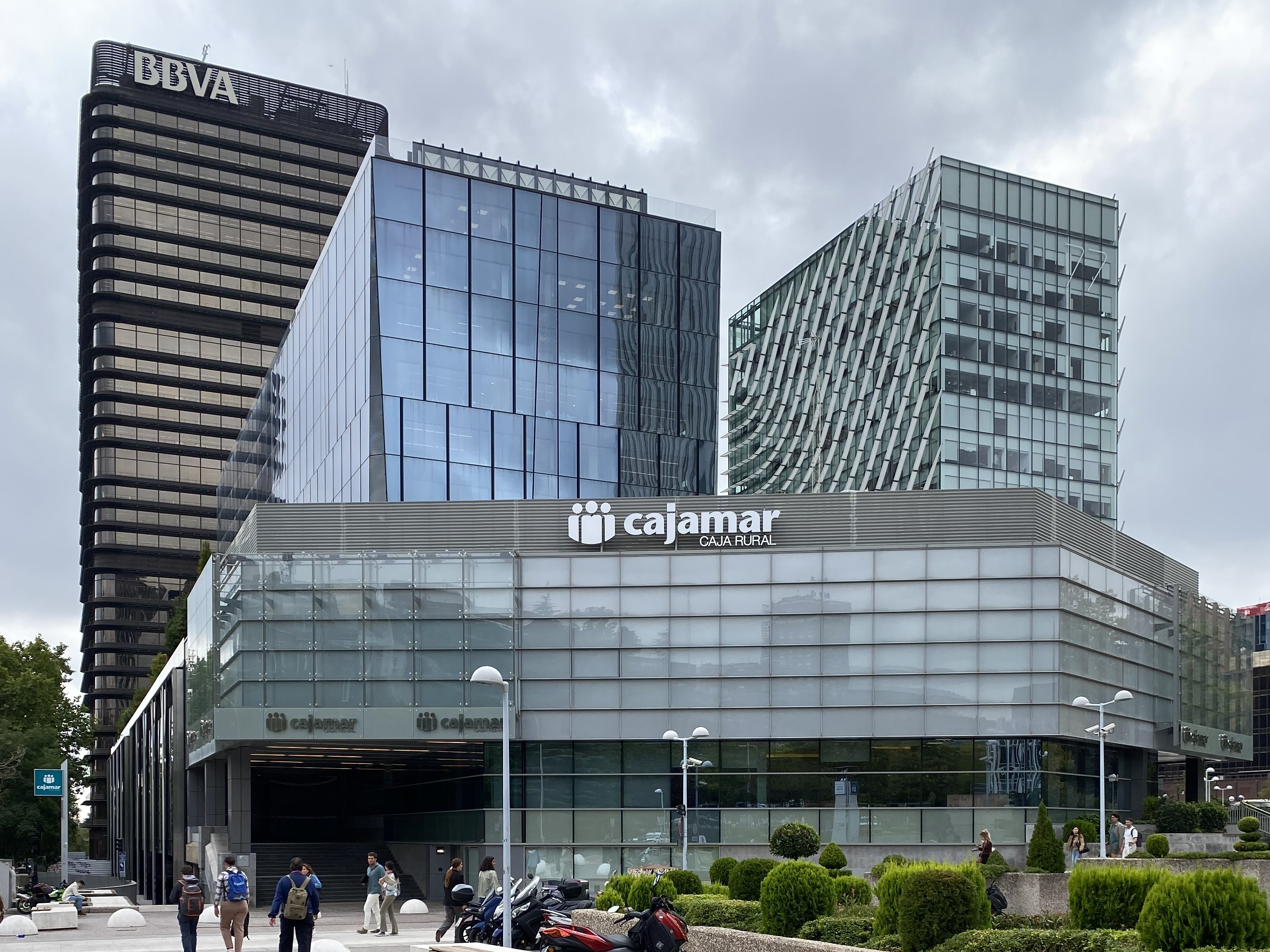
- Head office of the Cajamar Group at Paseo de la Castellana, 87 in Madrid
- Native name: El Banco de Crédito Social Cooperativo
- Company type: Cooperative bank S.A.
- Industry: Financial services
- Founded: 2014; 12 years ago
- Headquarters: Madrid, Spain
- Area served: Spain
- Key people: Luis Rodríguez González (President)
- Products: Banking services
- Number of employees: 6,248 (2023)
- Website: www.bcc.es

The Cajamar Cooperative Group (Spanish: Grupo Cooperativo Cajamar) is the largest grouping of agricultural cooperative banks (Spanish: cajas rurales) in Spain, with origins in the establishment in 1966 of Caja Rural de Almería, rebranded in 2000 as Cajamar Caja Rural.

Whereas Cajamar Caja Rural remains the group's most significant component, its national entity is Banco de Crédito Social Cooperativo, SA (BCC), a Madrid-headquartered bank established in 2014 by Cajamar Caja Rural and 31 other local agricultural cooperative banks. BCC has been designated as a Significant Institution since the entry into force of European Banking Supervision in late 2014, and as a consequence is directly supervised by the European Central Bank.

BCC acts as a central entity serving the financial needs of the local cooperative banks which together form the Cajamar Group. The Cajamar Cooperative Group was designated by the Bank of Spain as an institutional protection scheme, with the BCC as head entity. Under that arrangement, the individual local banks are exempt from solvency and liquidity requirements as these are supervised on a consolidated basis. In effect, the group's 18 local banks operate like branches, with no managerial independence.

Other entities of the Cajamar Group include Cajamar Vida and Cajamar Seguros Generales (insurance), Cimenta2 Gestión e Inversiones (asset management), as well as the Cajamar Foundation and the Plataforma Tierra digitalization initiative.

== History ==
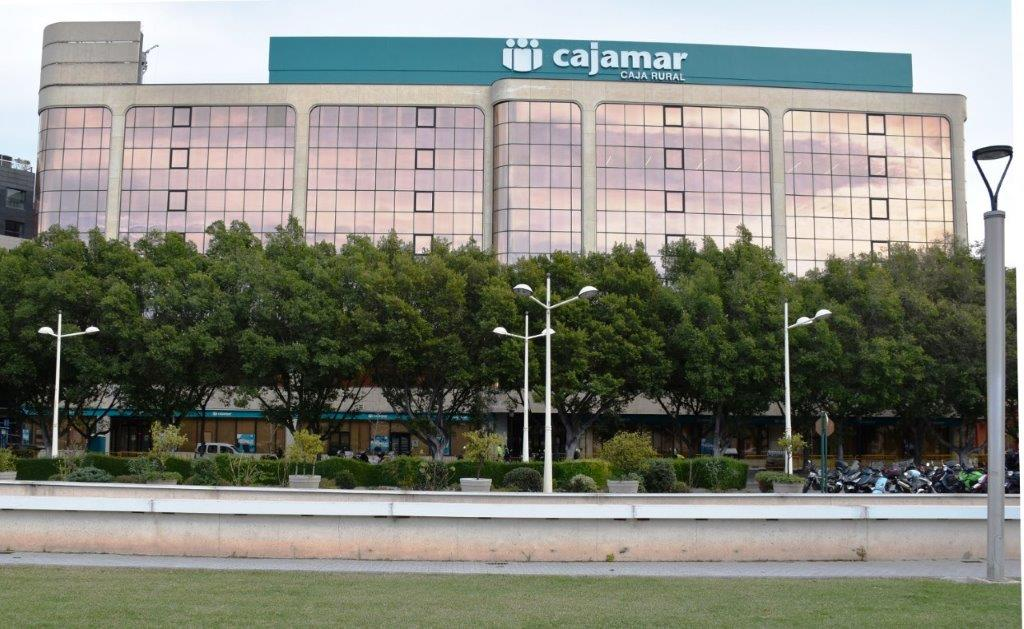
Cajamar building in Valencia

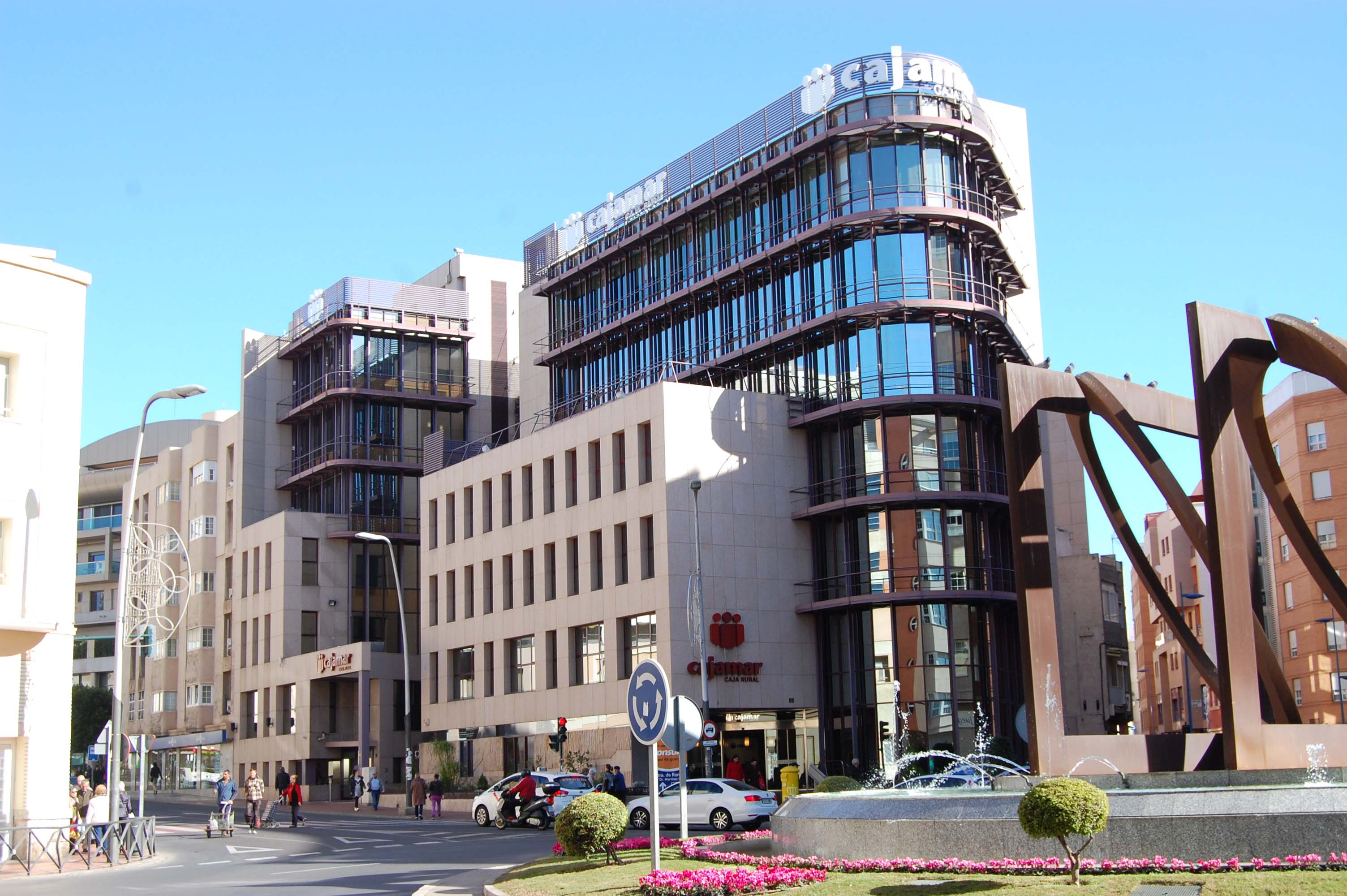
Head office of Cajamar Caja Rural in Almería

Cajamar Caja Rural was formed by the aggregation of a number of agricultural cooperative banks, its original core being the Caja Rural de Almería (est. 1966). In 2000, the latter merged with its peer in Málaga and adopted the name Cajamar, and also absorbed Grumeco in Madrid. In 2002, it was voted out of the Grupo Caja Rural cooperative group, and went on to form its own independent grouping including a national representative association, the Business Association of Credit Cooperative Entities (Spanish: Asociación Empresarial de Entidades Cooperativas de Crédito, ASEMECC). Cajamar further absorbed Caja Rural del Duero in 2007, Caixa Rural de Balears in 2010, CajaCampo in 2011, Caja Rural Castellón in 2012, Caja Rural de Canarias and Caixa Rural de Casinos in 2013, and Caixa Albalat in 2018.

In the early 2010s, Cajamar partnered with the 16 cooperative banks of the then Grupo Cooperativo Rurales del Mediterráneo, namely Ruralcaja (Caixes Rurals del Mediterrani), Caixa Rural Torrent, Crèdit València Caja Rural, Caixaltea, Caja Rural de Burriana, Caixa Callosa, Caixa Rural Nules, Caixa Alqueries, Caja Rural de Cheste, Caixa Rural d'Alginet, Caja Rural de Villar, Caixa Rural Vilavella, Caixa Rural Almenara, Caixa Rural Xilxes, Caja Rural Sant Vicent, and Xaixa Rural Vilafamés. Cajamar absorbed Ruralcaja and, with the 15 others plus Caixapetrer and Caixaturís, formed the Grupo Cajas Rurales Unidas (CRU). As a result, by 2019 the Cajamar Cooperative Group had reached its scope of 18 cooperative banks.

As of December 2022, these entities together with BCC had 1.6 million cooperative members and served 3.7 million clients in total. Cajamar Caja Rural was by far the largest of the member banks, accounting for 86.5 percent of their combined business as of 2020.

In addition to the 18 local cooperative banks of the Cajamar Cooperative Group, the shareholders of BCC still included 13 additional entities as of early 2026: the 8 cajas rurales that form the Solventia Cooperative Group, two independent local cooperative banks (Eurocaja Rural and Caixaguissona), plus 3 members of the Grupo Caja Rural, namely Caixalmassora, Caixa Rural Les Coves, and Caixa Vinaròs.

== Leadership ==
- Jesús Durbán Remón, President 1966–1973
- Jesús Espinosa Godoy, President 1973–1987
- Miguel Quesada Belmonte, President 1987–1992
- Juan del Águila Molina, President 1992–2006
- Antonio Pérez Lao, President 2006–2012
- Juan de la Cruz Cárdenas Rodríguez, President 2012–2016
- Eduardo Baamonde Noche, President since April 2016

== See also ==
- Solventia Cooperative Group
- Crédito Agrícola Group
- List of European cooperative banks
- List of banks in the euro area
- List of banks in Spain
