= Grupo Caja Rural =

Spanish cooperative banking group

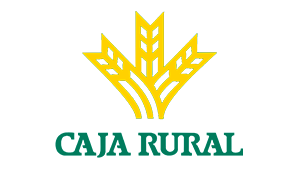
Group logo

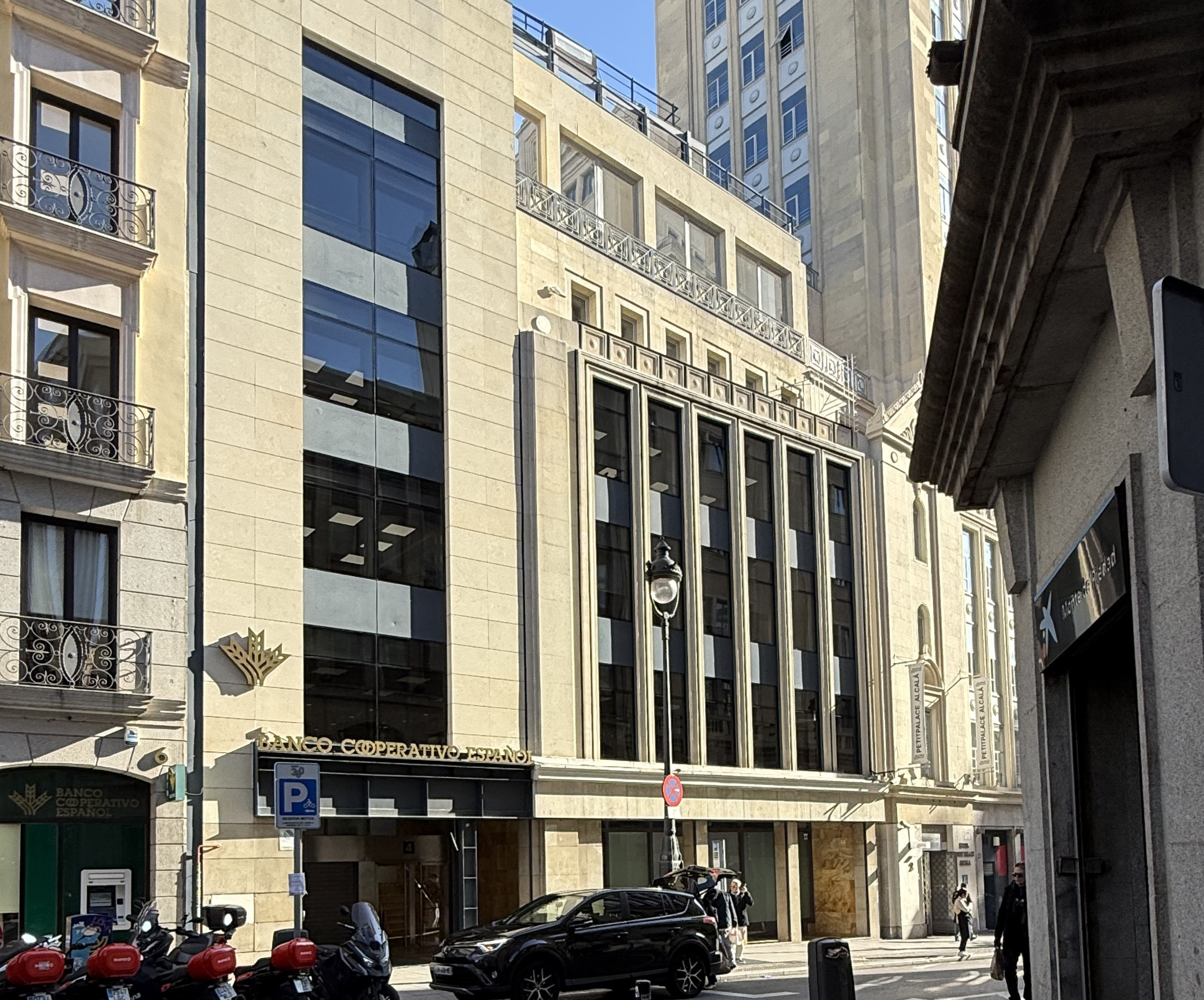
Head office of Banco Cooperativo Español in Madrid

Grupo Caja Rural (lit. 'Rural Cooperative Banking Group') is a loosely integrated cooperative banking group formed in 1989. With thirty Spanish rural credit cooperatives (Spanish: cajas rurales, sometimes translated as "agricultural credit unions") and other participating entities and over 6.3 million customers, it was the leading Spanish cooperative banking group as of July 2025. Similarly as with cooperative banking groups elsewhere in Europe, it relies on two central entities, respectively the non-profit Asociación Española de Cajas Rurales (AECR, lit. 'Spanish Association of Rural Cooperative Banks') and the financial institution Banco Cooperativo Español (BCE, lit. 'Spanish Cooperative Bank'). The AECR and BCE are both headquartered on adjacent locations on Calle de la Virgen de los Peligros in Madrid, Spain.

Grupo Caja Rural had aggregated assets of €98 billion at end-2024, including all entities participating in its institutional protection scheme managed by the AECR. It is not consolidated under European banking supervision, however, by which all its constituent banks are designated as less significant institutions and are thus under the direct supervision of the Bank of Spain.

== Background ==
Logo used in the Spanish cooperative banking sector before 1979

The origin of rural cooperative banking in Spain go back to the emulation of Friedrich Wilhelm Raiffeisen's endeavors in Germany, as happened elsewhere in Europe. The first Spanish Caja Rural was created in Amusco in 1901. More followed in subsequent years, and by the early 1920s there were around five thousand. Many of these entities were short-lived, but there were still over a thousand such local cooperative banks by 1936.

Francoist Spain took several initiatives to organize the rural cooperative banking sector. In 1946, the government shored up the ailing Servicio Nacional de Crédito Agrícola (SNCA), a public financial institution originally created in 1925. In 1959, it established the Caja Rural Nacional (CRUNA), then the Central de Cajas Rurales (CECAR), and also in 1962 renamed the SNCA as the Banco de Crédito Agrícola (BCA). In 1969, the Unión Nacional de Cooperativas de Crédito (UNACC) was established as a national organization of cooperative banks. In 1971 the cajas rurales came under the supervisory authority of the Bank of Spain. By 1977, there were 200 cooperative banks in Spain.

In the years following the restoration of democracy, the rural cooperative banks expanded into more banking services. In 1979, Caja Rural de Albacete adopted a new logo, referring to an ear of wheat, created by Croatian designer Ante Kvesić (spelled Kvessitch in Spain) and subsequently adopted by most (though not all) local cooperative banks in Spain. In 1980, the rural cooperative banks started sponsoring a UCI ProSeries cycling team, known as Caja Rural–Seguros RGA since 2013 after the group's insurance company joined as a co-sponsor.

Spain's cooperative banking sector, however, soon entered a phase of financial distress. Its share of total Spanish banking assets declined from a peak of 3.7 percent in late 1983 to 2.8 percent in late 1989; in 1984, the government implemented a plan along the lines of France's Crédit Agricole, in which the BCA was integrated into the Instituto de Crédito Oficial and absorbed the CRUNA. This revamped BCA acted as a central financial entity serving 57 cajas rurales, known as Cajas Rurales Asociadas. The resulting group referred to as Grupo Asociado BCA-CRA or simply Grupo BCA.

In March 1986, Seguros RGA (for Rural Grupo Asegurador) was established as the group's insurance affiliate, owned by the individual rural cooperative banks. In 1988, Seguros RCA opened its capital to Germany's R+V Versicherung for a 45 percent stake, which was subsequently reduced to 30 percent.

In 1987-1988, the BCA-CRA construct started to unravel as individual cajas rurales started to withdraw from it.

== Creation and development ==
On 4 July 1989, 23 cajas rurales seceded from the BCA-CRA group by establishing the Asociación Española de Cooperativas de Crédito (AECC). A few weeks later, they started the process to establish the BCE, which was formally created on 31 July 1990. In 1994, they adopted the brand identity "Grupo Caja Rural", and in 1995 the AECC renamed itself as AECR. Meanwhile in 1991, what remained of the BCA was absorbed by Argentaria. By 2000, more than 80 cajas rurales, representing 90 percent of the Spanish agricultural cooperative banking sector's total assets, had joined the AECR.

In June 2002, the sector fragmented again as Cajamar Caja Rural was voted out of the AECR. Cajamar went on to create its own network, centered on a new nonprofit body called the Asociación Empresarial de Entidades Cooperativas de Crédito (ASEMECC, lit. 'Business Association of Credit Cooperative Entities'), which became the Cajamar Cooperative Group.

Grupo Caja Rural was reorganized in the late 2010s. On 29 December 2017, the group's cajas rurales and BCE agreed to create an institutional protection scheme (IPS) together with Grucajrural Inversiones, a holding entity established at the same time. Grucajrural Inversiones took over the shares previously owned by the cajas rurales in BCE and Seguros RGA. Simultaneously, a fund was established under the AECR to support the IPS. Unlike peer IPSs in Austria and Germany, however, that of Grupo Caja Rural does not manage its own deposit guarantee scheme.

As of 2024, DZ Bank, the central financial entity of the German Cooperative Financial Group, held 12 percent equity ownership in BCE. The remaining 88 percent were held by Grucajrural Inversiones, which also held a 99.9 percent stake in Seguros RGA.

== Membership ==
The annual report of the Grupo Caja Rural's institutional protection scheme for 2024 listed the following entities as its members:

- Banco Cooperativo Español (BCE), in Madrid
- Caja Rural Central, in Orihuela
- Caja Rural de Gijón, in Gijón
- Caja Rural de Navarra, in Pamplona
- Caja Rural de Extremadura, in Badajoz
- Caja Rural de Salamanca, in Salamanca
- Caja Rural de Soria, in Soria
- Caja Rural Regional San Agustín Fuente Álamo Murcia, in Fuente Álamo
- Caja Rural de Granada, in Grenade
- Caja Rural de Asturias, in Oviedo
- Caja Rural de Burgos, Fuentepelayo, Segovia y Castelldans (CAJAVIVA), in Segovia
- Caja Rural de Jaén, Barcelona y Madrid, in Mengíbar
- Caixa Rural Galega, in Lugo
- Cajasiete Caja Rural, in Santa Cruz de Tenerife
- Caja Rural de Teruel, in Teruel
- Caja Rural de Zamora, in Zamora
- Caja Rural de L'Alcudia, in L'Alcúdia
- Caja Rural San José de Alcora, in Alcora
- Caja Rural de Algemesí, in Algemesí
- Caja Rural de Casas Ibáñez, in Casas-Ibáñez
- Caja Rural San José de Almassora, in Almassora
- Caja Rural Nuestra Señora de La Esperanza de Onda, in Onda
- Ruralnostra, in Betxí
- Caja Rural de Villamalea, in Villamalea
- Caja Rural de Albal, in Albal
- Caixa Popular, in Valencia
- Caixa Rural Les Coves de Vinromà, in Les Coves de Vinromà
- Caixa Rural de Vinaròs, in Vinaròs
- Caja Rural del Sur, in Seville
- Caja Rural de Albacete, Ciudad Real y Cuenca, branded Globalcaja, in Albacete
- Caja Rural de Aragón, in Zaragoza
- Grucajrural Inversiones, in Madrid

The individual cajas rurales, though not BCE or Grucajrural Inversiones, are simultaneously members of UNACC, as are some individual members of the Cajamar Cooperative Group as well as Laboral Kutxa, Caja de Ingenieros, and FIARE Banca Ética.

== See also ==
- Crédito Agrícola Group
- List of banks in the euro area
- List of banks in Spain
- List of European cooperative banks
- European Association of Co-operative Banks
