= Banco Santander Portugal =

Private bank in Portugal

Banco Santander Totta S.A.
- Trade name: Banco Santander (Portugal)
- Industry: Financial services
- Founded: 1988
- Headquarters: R. Mesquita 6, 1070-238 Lisboa
- Area served: Nationwide
- Key people: Pedro Castro e Almeida (CEO)
- Products: Banking
- Number of employees: 6,781 (2017)
- Parent: Santander Group (100%)
- Website: www.santander.pt

Banco Santander Totta S.A., also known as Banco Santander (Portugal), is a subsidiary of Spanish bank Banco Santander in Portugal. Founded in 1988, it is currently the largest private bank in Portugal. In 2000, the then Banco Totta was acquired by Santander Group, later changing its name to Banco Santander Totta. In 2004 the bank absorbed sister company Crédito Predial Português.

In Portugal, the Banco Santander Totta has 670 branches (2017) of which 280 offer accessibility for people with reduced mobility and 1,898 ATM installed, which can be used by customers and non-customers, complying with the accessibility regulations. The bank currently has 6,781 employees and 4.7 million customers of which 558 thousand digital customers.

In December 2015, the Banco Santander Totta purchased Banco Internacional do Funchal for 150 million euros.

In June 2017, Banco Santander bought the Banco Popular Español for the symbolic value of 1 euro. The brand Banco Popular Portugal disappeared increasing the size of Banco Santander Totta.

In 2018, Banco Santander Totta was renamed Banco Santander (Portugal), within the scope of the Banco Santander brand renewal strategy.

== See also ==
- List of banks in Portugal
