= Banif Financial Group =

Portuguese financial services group, 1988–2015

Banif – SGPS, S.A.
- Type: Sociedade Anónima
- Traded as: Euronext: BNF
- Industry: Financial services
- Founded: 1988 in Funchal, Portugal
- Founder: Horácio Roque
- Defunct: December 21, 2015
- Fate: Nationalised and sold to Santander Group
- Successor: Banco Santander Portugal
- Key people: Jorge Tomé (CEO), Luís Amado (Chairman)
- Products: Retail and investment banking, insurance, asset management, private equity, factoring
- Revenue: €552.5 million (2010)
- Operating income: €58.1 million (2010)
- Net income: €33.4 million (2010)
- Total assets: €15.71 billion (end 2010)
- Total equity: €1.279 billion (end 2010)
- Number of employees: 5,400 (end 2010)
- Website: www.grupobanif.pt

Banif Financial Group (Portuguese: Banif - Grupo Financeiro) was a Portuguese international financial services group associated with Banco Internacional do Funchal. The company had a presence in Europe, South America, North America, Africa and Asia. In 2015, it was bailed-out by the Portuguese state and sold to Santander Group.

== History ==
Banif was founded and incorporated by Horácio Roque on 15 January 1988 and took over all of the assets and liabilities of the defunct Caixa Económica do Funchal. In 1995, it opened offices in Caracas, Venezuela and South Africa; in 1996 in São Paulo, Brazil; and in 2008 in San Ġiljan, Malta.

On 15 January 2008, the bank rebranded, adopting a centaur as its symbol, a "symbol of strength and intelligence", the usage of indigo as a brand color, with its own "strength and personality", as well as being easy to recognize, and the slogan A força de acreditar (the power of believing) in order to boost support for the bank. A total of €20 million was invested in the campaign.

In the wake of the Portuguese sovereign debt and banking crisis, Banif was one among a number of Portuguese banks which were nationalized in order to be rescued by the government. In December 2015, as part of a 2.2 billion euro bailout and restructuring, the Portuguese government sold the remainder of Banif's assets to Banco Santander Portugal, the Portuguese subsidiary of Santander Group, for 150 million euros.

== Subsidiaries ==
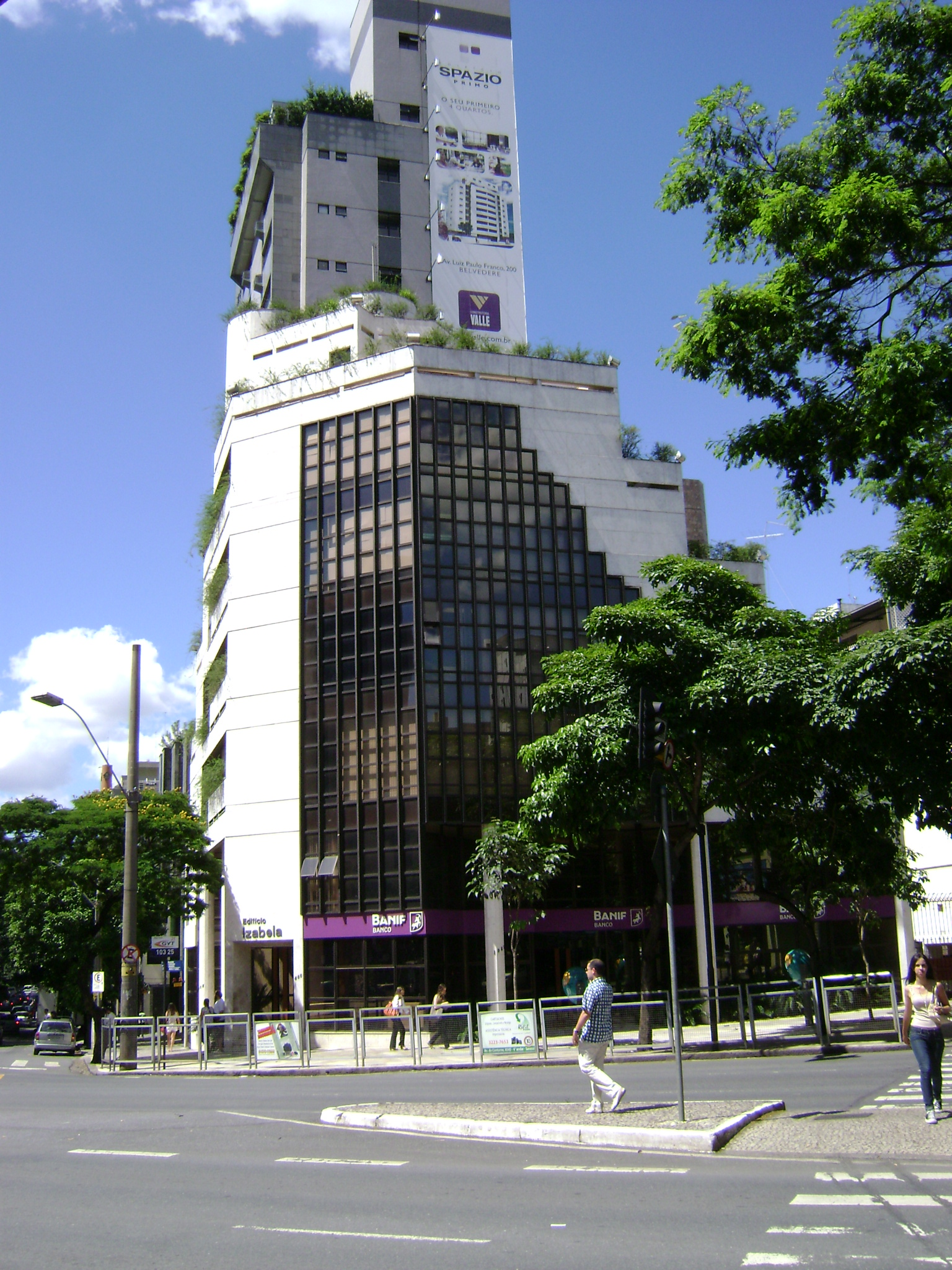
Banif in Belo Horizonte.

Banif consisted of the following subsidiaries, most of which have either been incorporated or purchased:

- SGM – Sociedade Gestora de Fundos de Pensões Mundial, S.A. (1989)
- Ascor Dealer – Sociedade Financeira de Corretagem, S.A. (1989)
- Mundileasing – Sociedade de Locação Financeira, S.A. (1990)
- Mundicre – Sociedade Financeira para Aquisições a Crédito, S.A. (1991)
- Banifundos – Sociedade Gestora de Fundos de Investimento Mobiliário, S.A. (1991)
- Invesfeiras – Investimentos Imobiliários, S.A. (1991)
- Banif – Investimentos – S.G.P.S., S.A. (1992)
- Banifólio – Sociedade Gestora de Patrimónios, S.A. (1992)
- Banif – Banco Internacional do Funchal (Cayman), Ltd. (1993)
- Açoreana Seguros (1996)
- Banco Comercial dos Açores (1996)
- BanifServ Agrupamento Complementar de Empresas de Serviços, Sistemas e Tecnologias de Informação (1997)
- Banif – Banco de Investimento, S.A. (2000)
- Banif Financial Services, Inc. (2001)
- Banif Mortgage Company (2002)

== Stock exchange floats ==
=== Portuguese ===
In March 1992, Banif first appeared on the Lisbon and Porto stock exchanges.

=== North American ===
In 2002, Banif Securities acquired the Brazilian brokerage firm Indusval, giving them a place on the floor of the New York Stock Exchange.
