= Banca Popolare =

Banca Popolare (Popular Bank) or Banca del Popolo (People's Bank) may refer to several Italian banks:

== Current banks ==
- Südtiroler Volksbank – Banca Popolare dell'Alto Adige, a South Tyrol bank
- Banca Popolare di Bari, an Italian bank
- Banca Popolare di Cividale, an Italian bank
- Banca Popolare dell'Emilia Romagna, former name of BPER Banca, an Italian listed company
- Banca Popolare FriulAdria, a subsidiary of Crédit Agricole Italia
- Banca Popolare del Frusinate, an Italian bank
- Banca Popolare del Lazio, an Italian bank
- Banca Popolare Province Molisane, an Italian bank; see Banca Caripe
- Banca Popolare di Milano, a subsidiary of Banco BPM, former listed company
- Banca Popolare di Puglia e Basilicata, an Italian bank
- Banca Popolare Pugliese, an Italian bank
- Banca Popolare di Sondrio, an Italian listed company
- Banca Popolare di Spoleto, a subsidiary of Banco di Desio e della Brianza

== Brands ==
- Banca Popolare di Lodi, a brand of Banco BPM, former incorporated company
- Banca Popolare di Novara, a brand of Banco BPM, former incorporated company
- Banca Popolare di Verona, a brand of Banco BPM, former incorporated company

== Defunct banks ==
- Banca Popolare dell'Adriatico, a predecessor of Banca dell'Adriatico, a subsidiary of Intesa Sanpaolo
- Banca Popolare dell'Alto Lazio, a predecessor of Banca Popolare dell'Etruria e del Lazio
- Banca Popolare di Ancona, a defunct subsidiary of UBI Banca
- Banca Popolare di Bergamo, a defunct subsidiary of UBI Banca
- Banca Popolare di Brescia, a predecessor of Bipop Carire
- Banca Popolare Commercio e Industria, a defunct subsidiary of UBI Banca
- Banca Popolare dell'Etruria e del Lazio, a predecessor of Nuova Banca dell'Etruria e del Lazio
  - Banca Popolare dell'Etruria, a predecessor of Banca Popolare dell'Etruria e del Lazio
- Banca Popolare di Lanciano e Sulmona, a defunct subsidiary of Banca Popolare dell'Emilia Romagna
- Banca Popolare di Lecco, a defunct subsidiary of Deutsche Bank
- Banca Mutua Popolare di Mantova, a predecessor of Banca Agricola Mantovana
- Banca Popolare di Mantova, a defunct subsidiary of Banca Popolare di Milano
- Banca Popolare di Modena, a predecessor of Banca Popolare dell'Emilia Romagna
- Banca Popolare di Montebelluna, a predecessor of Veneto Banca
- Banca Popolare del Molise, a defunct subsidiary of Rolo Banca
- Banca Popolare di Rieti, a defunct subsidiary of UniCredit
- Banca Popolare Veneta, a predecessor of Banca Antonveneta
- Banca Popolare di Vicenza, a defunct bank

== See also ==
- Banco Popolare
- Banca di Credito Popolare di Torre del Greco
- Banca Agricola Popolare di Ragusa
- Credito Valtellinese, governed by the same banking law as other Banca Popolare
- UBI Banca
