= Unione Fiduciaria =

Italian custodial bank

- Native name: Unione Fiduciaria S.p.A.
- Formerly: Società Fiduciaria e di Servizi delle Banche Popolari Italiane
- Company type: Joint venture of (mostly) listed companies
- Industry: Financial services
- Founded: 1958; 67 years ago
- Headquarters: 4 via Amedei, Milan, Italy
- Key people: Roberto Ruozi (President); Filippo Cappio (General Manager)
- Services: Custodial services, Fiduciary services
- Revenue: €30,252,927 (2014)
- Operating income: €4,284,794 (2014)
- Net income: ▲€2,003,250 (2014)
- Total assets: ▲€67,069,387 (2014)
- Total equity: ▲€33,286,580 (2014)
- Website: www.unionefiduciaria.it
- Footnotes / references source

Unione Fiduciaria S.p.A. – Società Fiduciaria e di Servizi delle Banche Popolari Italiane (literally Fiduciary Union) is an Italian custodial bank that specialized in custodial services.

== History ==
The bank was formed by 8 People's Banks (Italian: Banca Popolare) of Italy in 1958 to act as custodian for those banks.

On 30 April 2015 UBI Banca sold the business in UBI Fiduciaria to Unione Fiduciaria. In 2016 Unione Fiduciaria acquired Istifid, which was owned by Banco di Desio e della Brianza, Credito Valtellinese, Canova Investissements, Allianz Bank Financial Advisors S.p.A., Banco Azzoaglio and others. After the deal Credito Valtellinese and Banco Desio increased their stakes in Unione Fiduciaria. Istifid acquired Aperta Fiduciaria, a wholly owned subsidiary of Credito Valtellinese in 2013.

== Shareholders ==
In 2013 UBI Banca sold all its stake (10.501%) for €3.4 million.

As of 31 December 2014 the bank had the following shareholders:

- Banca Popolare dell'Emilia Romagna (24%)
- Banca Popolare di Sondrio (24%)
- DepoBank (24%)
- Banca Popolare di Puglia e Basilicata (0.79%)
- Banca Popolare di Cortona (0.0185%)
- other shareholders
  - Banca Agricola Popolare di Ragusa
  - Banca Valsabbina
  - Banca di Credito Popolare di Torre del Greco
  - Banca Popolare di Bari
  - Banca Popolare del Cassinate
  - Banca Popolare di Cividale
  - UBI Banca
  - Banca Popolare di Fondi
  - Banca Popolare di Lajatico
  - Banca Popolare del Lazio
  - Banco BPM
  - Banca Popolare Pugliese
  - Banca Popolare Sant'Angelo
  - Banca Popolare Valconca
  - Banca di Piacenza
  - Credito Valtellinese
  - SanFelice 1893 Banca Popolare
  - Südtiroler Volksbank (plus ex-Banca Popolare di Marostica)

== See also ==
- Istituto Centrale delle Banche Popolari Italiane
