= Atlante (private equity fund) =

Atlante is an Italian banking sector owned bail-out equity fund that is dedicated to recapitalize some Italian banks, as well as purchase the securities of the junior tranches of non-performing loans. It was established in 2015 in response to the Italian bad debt crisis of that year. The fund was under regulation by the EU Alternative Investment Fund Managers Directive.

According to Federico Ghizzoni, former CEO of UniCredit, although the bank may inject €1 billion to the fund, the bank had a priority to sell their bad loan to the fund. UniCredit had about €20 billion net value of bad loans on the balance sheets as of 31 December 2015. Moreover, both UniCredit and Intesa Sanpaolo (via Banca IMI) were already underwritten Banca Popolare di Vicenza and Veneto Banca for a combined €2.5 billion capital increase. The contributions of the fund would make the fund become the buyer of the unsold shares, instead of the banks themselves. As BPVi announced that the new shares would be priced between €3 and €0.1 per share, the fund on behalf of UniCredit would purchase the unsold share for €0.1 only.

It was reported that banking foundations, such as Fondazione Cariplo, Fondazione Cariparo, Compagnia di San Paolo and Fondazione CRT, which in previous banking reforms were forced to sell their banking subsidiaries (forced to diversify investments), were invited to invest in the fund. According to ACRI, the foundations had €40 billion shareholders' equity, with most of them no longer owning their banks in majority or entirely sold. Fondazione Cariplo, a shareholder of Intesa Sanpaolo and the management firm of the fund, had a shareholders' equity of €8.9 billion.

On 29 April 2016 Quaestio announced that the fund had collected €4.249 billion from 67 investors including Cassa Depositi e Prestiti.

== Backgrounds ==
=== Bad debt crisis of Italy ===
The Italian banking sector suffered from the impact of the recession of the country. According to Banca d'Italia (the central bank), the non-performing loans (NPLs) of the whole banking system stood at €360 billion gross book value in December 2015 (peaked in September 2015) with more than half being sofferenze (€210 billion, means bad loan). On average, the total NPLs to total loans ratio was 18%, the highest among European Union.

The five largest banking groups (by total assets), UniCredit, Intesa Sanpaolo, Banca Monte dei Paschi di Siena (BMPS), UBI Banca and Banco Popolare, had €225 billion of NPLs (€135 billion were bad loans among the NPLs) in gross book value in that period.

Bank	Gross NPLs	Gross NPLs / total loans ratio	Net NPLs	Net NPLs / total loans ratio	Gross bad loans	Gross bad loans / total loans ratio	Net bad loans	Net bad loans / total loans ratio	Footnotes
UniCredit	€79.760 billion	15.42%	€38.920 billion	8.21%	€51.089 billion	9.88%	€19.924 billion	4.20%	source: 2015 Annual Report
Intesa Sanpaolo	€63.114 billion	16.51%	€33.086 billion	9.45%	€39.150 billion	10.24%	€14.973 billion	4.28%	source: 2015 Annual Report
BMPS	€46.9 billion		€24.154 billion	21.69%	€26.627 billion		€9.733 billion	8.74%	source: 2015 Annual Report
UBI Banca	€13.434 billion	15.14%	€9.689 billion	11.45%	€6.988 billion	7.87%	€4,287 billion	5.07%	source: 2015 Annual Report
Banco Popolare	€20.645 billion	24.19%	€14.057 billion	17.92%	€14.786 billion	17.33%	€6.458 billion	8.24%	source: 2015 Annual Report; Would become part of Banco BPM
Total	€225 billion	18.3%			€135 billion	11.0%			source: Banca d'Italia
Banca Popolare di Milano	€5.997 billion	16.32%	€3.624 billion	10.60%	€3.276 billion	8.91%	€1.785 billion	4.36%	source: 2015 Annual Report; Would become part of Banco BPM

While among the large to medium banks (total assets larger than €21.5 billion, minus the top five banks (Note: Banca d'Italia did not disclose the full list, but roughly equal to 9 others banks that were supervised by European Central Bank directly, plus BNL, Cariparma, Crediop, Deutsche Bank S.p.A. (subsidiaries of foreign banking group), Banca Mediolanum and Credito Valtellinese)) had a total NPL of €76 billion and €41 billion bad loan in gross book value. For example, Banca Popolare dell'Emilia Romagna's gross NPLs to total loan ratio was 23.28% or €11.395 billion in size.

If including the data from large to micro banks (whole system minus top 5 banks), the gross book value of NPLs was €135 billion, €75 billion of them were bad loans.

At the same time in order to boost the securitization of bad loans, the Italian government had guaranteed the senior tranche of the securitizated NPLs. (Garanzia sulla Cartolarizzazione delle Sofferenze), which in line with the strict rule of state aid by the European Union, as junior tranche was excluding from the guarantee scheme. Usually the riskiest junior tranche would be repurchased by the banks themselves. However, a plan to disposal all tranches was planned, which Atlante was aiming for junior tranches.

Additionally, the bail-out of Banca delle Marche, CariChieti, CariFerrara and Banca Etruria along with the four small-sized banks (definition of small: total assets between €21.5 billion and €3.6 billion), had to write down €8.5 billion of bad loans to €1.5 billion (and transferred to a "bad bank", REV - Gestione Crediti, a company without banking license, in early 2016), causing Italian National Resolution Fund for about €3.7 billion capital injection and recapitalization, as well as the bail-in of shareholders and subordinate bond investors. (The retail investors of the bonds were only refurbished in mid-2016.)

=== New shares facing low demands ===
Moreover, among the first 14 largest Italian banks that were supervised by the European Central Bank directly, (Note: The top 5, plus Mediobanca, Banca Popolare dell'Emilia Romagna, ICCREA Holding, Banca Popolare di Milano, Banca Popolare di Vicenza, Banca Carige, Veneto Banca, Banca Popolare di Sondrio and Credito Emiliano) they were required a higher CET1 ratio after Supervisory Review and Evaluation Process (such as over 10% CET1 ratio for BMPS). and Banca Popolare di Vicenza). In 2015 banks such as BMPS (for about €3 billion) and Banca Carige were recapitalized. In 2016 three of the aforementioned 14 banks, Banco Popolare, Banca Popolare di Vicenza and Veneto Banca, also announced the plan of recapitalization of €1 billion, €1.5 billion and €1 billion respectively. BP Vicenza and Veneto Banca were underwritten by UniCredit and Banca IMI (Intesa Sanpolo) respectively, Italy's two largest banks. However, as most of the banks were under-capitalized, market capitalization of the banks was under their equity value, plus a low profit margin, making the new shares of BP Vicenza may be purchased by UniCredit entirely due to low demand, triggering a domino effect that caused UniCredit to recapitalize itself.

=== European Commission attitude towards state aid ===
In December 2015 the European Commission ruled that the bail-out of Banca Tercas by the Fondo Interbancario di Tutela dei Depositi (FITD in short; mandatory deposit guarantee fund) was state aid. The commission also ruled that the aid affected the market's effectiveness, thus the banks must return the aid to the deposit guarantee fund. Any bail-out by the government must be in line with the EU's new Bank Recovery and Resolution Directive.

However, the bail-out of Banca delle Marche, CariChieti, CariFerrara and Banca Etruria by the government (though utilized the mandatory contribution of all Italian banks), also bail-in of shareholders and subordinated bond holders, had caused public controversy that many bond holders were actually retail investors, making the Bank Recovery and Resolution Directive unpopular as a tool to bail out the bank. A private bail-out fund must be created to solve the problem of the banking system. In early 2016, FITD added a voluntary scheme in its article of associations, which bail out Banca Tercas by voluntary contribution of the member banks of FITD. (It was followed by Cassa di Risparmio di Cesena, a small bank in mid 2016) Even before the introduction of the voluntary scheme, FITD officials had also declared that the fund could not bail out the aforementioned four banks entirely, due to the fund's small size. The resolution fund bailed out the banks by €3.7 billion only were in fact aided by bail-in. A large private equity fund was demanded if large to medium-sized banks of Italy were required to be bailed out. Atlante was aimed at a size of €4-6 billion with a promise that the investment was profitable in order to attract investors in market condition.

== Responses ==
Fitch Ratings announced that the contributions to the fund may weaken the large banks. While Reuters, Financial Times expressed that Italian banking problem is too big for the fund.

== Operations ==
=== First capital increase ===
On 15 April 2016 Intesa Sanpaolo announced that the bank would invest €800 million to €1,000 million in the fund, with the total size of the fund to vary from €4 billion to €6 billion. On the same day Banca Popolare di Milano, Banca Popolare dell'Emilia Romagna, Credito Valtellinese, Banca Monte dei Paschi di Siena, and Banca Carige announced that the bank would invest €100 million, €100 million, €60 million, €50 million and €20 million respectively in the fund. On the following Monday, a €200 million investment from UBI Banca was announced. On the same day UniCredit formally announced that the fund would be sub-underwriting the IPO of Banca Popolare di Vicenza.

=== Recapitalizing banks ===
Atlante subscribed the entire capital increase of BPVi (for €1.5 billion) after Borsa Italiana rejecting the listing of the bank. Offer other than Atlante were voided after the listing in the Borsa was denied. It was followed by purchasing most of the new shares of Veneto Banca (€988,582,329.50), which some investors of the new shares other than Atlante, excised their rights to withdraw after the listing to the Borsa also failed.

Following the announcement of annual Supervisory Review and Evaluation Process (SREP), which BPVi and Veneto Banca were barely above the new Tier 1 Capital requirement (10.75% and 10.74% respectively, verse required 10.25% Atlante deposited €310 million and €628 million respectively to the banks as advanced payments for future capital increases. However, it was insufficient for the two banks, which saw the investment of Atlante in the two banks were bailed-in, and the good assets of the two banks were acquired by Intesa Sanpaolo, by a government funded bail-out of the depositors.

== Management ==
The fund was managed by Quaestio Capital Management SGR S.p.A., a wholly owned subsidiary of Quaestio Holding S.A., which was owned by Fondazione Cariplo (37.65%), Fondazione Cassa dei Risparmi di Forlì (6.75%), Cassa Italiana di Previdenza e Assistenza dei Geometri liberi professionisti (18%), Locke S.r.l. (22%) and Direzione Generale Opere Don Bosco (15.60%) as of 2018.

== Shareholders ==
- Intesa Sanpaolo (€845 million)
- UniCredit (€845 million)
- Cassa Depositi e Prestiti (€500 million)
- Poste Vita (€260 million)
- UBI Banca (€200 million)
- Banco BPM (€150 million)
- BPER Banca (€100 million)
- UnipolSai (€100 million)
- Compagnia di San Paolo (€100 million)
- Fondazione Cariplo (€100 million)
- Credito Valtellinese (€60 million)
- Banca Popolare di Sondrio (€50 million)
- Banca Monte dei Paschi di Siena (€50 million)
- Fondazione CRT (€50 million)
- Banca Mediolanum (€50 million)
- Allianz (€50 million)
- CreditRas Vita (€50 million)
- Cattolica Assicurazioni (€40 million)
- Banca Carige (€20 million)
- Fondazione Cariparma (€20 million)

== Atlante II ==
On 8 August 2016 the second fund, Atlante II, had raised €1.715 billion in order to finance the purchase of NPLs.

On 28 August 2016 the fund manager employed Credito Fondiario as service provider in NPLs.

On 29 July 2016 Atlante signed a memorandum of understanding to buy the mezzanine notes of the securitized bad loan portfolio of Banca Monte dei Paschi di Siena. BMPS was the weakest banks among the 51 banks of 2016 European Union bank stress test. The deal was finalized in 2018, with Atlante II was the actual buyer, for 95% mezzanine notes for a purchase price of €805 million.

In 2017, Atlante II was renamed to Italian Recovery Fund. The fund purchased the NPLs from the savings banks from Cesena, Rimini and San Miniato. The three banks were purchased by Crédit Agricole Italia with a condition to clean-up the NPLs before the deal.
