= Banca del Salento – Credito Popolare Salentino =

Banca 121 S.p.A.
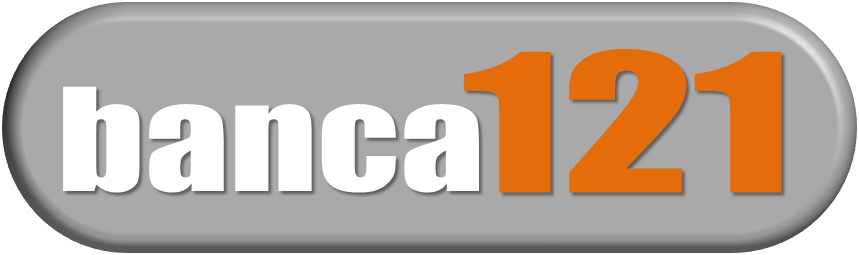
- Formerly: Banca del Salento – Credito Popolare Salentino
- Company type: subsidiary of a listed company
- Industry: Financial services
- Defunct: 2002
- Fate: absorbed by the parent company
- Successor: Banca 121 Promozione Finanziaria; retail branches of BMPS
- Headquarters: Lecce, Italy
- Owner: Banca Monte dei Paschi di Siena
- Parent: Banca Monte dei Paschi di Siena

Banca del Salento – Credito Popolare Salentino S.p.A. was an Italian bank from Lecce, Apulia. The bank was named after the historic Salento region. The bank was acquired by Banca Monte dei Paschi di Siena in 2000, and transformed into Banca 121.

== History ==
Banca del Salento – Credito Popolare Salentino S.p.A. common known as just Banca del Salento S.p.A., was formed by the merger of Banca del Salento S.p.A. and Credito Popolare Salentino S.c.a.r.l. in 1997. The pro forma market share in deposits in the Province of Lecce in 1996 was 20.7%. The bank is also known as Banca 121.

In 2000 Banca Monte dei Paschi di Siena purchased Banca del Salento. At that time Banca del Salento was the leader in asset management for the clients (Italian: gestione su base individuale di portafogli di investimento per conto terzi (GPM)) in Apulia, ahead Banca Intesa, Banca Antonveneta, UniCredit, Credito Emiliano, Banca Popolare Pugliese, Banca di Roma, Banca Popolare di Puglia e Basilicata and Banca Popolare di Bari and other banks in all 5 provinces.

In 2001, Banca 121 had 104 branches, and a shareholders' equity of €541,938,000 in consolidated basis at 31 December 2001.

In 2002, the bank was absorbed by the parent company, at the same time spin off a division to form Banca 121 Promozione Finanziaria (became MPS Banca Personale in 2004).

After the absorption a scandal was exposed that the bank sold risky financial products to clients with misleading information.

== Key people ==
- Lorenzo Gorgoni (1973–2002)

== Sponsorship ==
The bank was a sponsor of football club U.S. Lecce.

== See also ==
- List of banks in Italy
