= Cassa di Risparmio di Ferrara =

Italian bank

Nuova Cassa di Risparmio di Ferrara
- Trade name: Nuova Carife
- Native name: Nuova Cassa di Risparmio di Ferrara S.p.A.
- Formerly: Cassa di Risparmio di Ferrara; Cassa di Risparmio di Ferrara S.p.A.
- Type: subsidiary
- Industry: financial services
- Founded: 1838
- Defunct: 20 November 2017
- Fate: foundation and banking activities were split in 1991; was nationalized in 2015; was acquired and became branches of BPER Banca in 2017
Successor
BPER Banca branches	(banking activities)
Carife Foundation	(charity only)
- Headquarters: Ferrara, Italy
- Number of locations: 105 branches (2016)
Key people
Giosuè Boldrini	(chairman)
Antonio Rosignoli	(general manager)
- Services: retail and corporate banking
- Net income: (€220 million) (2016)
- Total assets: ▼€2.630 billion (2016)
- Total equity: ▼(€66 million) (2016)
- Owner: BPER Banca (100%)
- Parent: BPER Banca
- Divisions: Banca Modenese
- Subsidiaries: Banca Farnese; Carife SIM; Carife Servizi Evolutivi Integrati
- Capital ratio: ▼ −4.78% (CET1, Dec.2016)
- Rating: Withdrew rating (Moody's, 7 March 2013)
- Website: www.carife.it
- Footnotes in consolidated financial statement; based on last available data

Nuova Cassa di Risparmio di Ferrara S.p.A., known as Nuova Carife [New Carife] in short, was an Italian bank, based in Ferrara, Emilia-Romagna. Nuova Carife was founded on 22 November 2015 as a good bank that spin off from the original Cassa di Risparmio di Ferrara S.p.A. (Carife). The old Carife was under administration from 2013 and 2015, and now being liquidated as a bad bank. Nevertheless, Nuova Carife was a short-lived bank, which was acquired by BPER Banca in 2017 from Italian Resolution Fund, becoming branches of the banking group in the same year. The former majority shareholder and the old legal person of the bank, Fondazione Cassa di Risparmio di Ferrara (Fondazione Carife), survived as a charity organization.

== History ==
=== Cassa di Risparmio di Ferrara ===
Found in 1838 by Count Alessandro Masi, Cassa di Risparmio di Ferrara was one of the oldest savings bank (Italian: cassa di risparmio) after Bologna (since 1837), Spoleto (since 1836; renamed and relocated in 2012; closed 2016) and Rome (1836; now defunct) in the Papal States (but not in the whole Italy). From 1927 to 1942 the bank acquired Cassa di Risparmio di Copparo, Banca Mutua Popolare di Bondeno, the local mount of piety of Ferrara (found 1508), Banca di Portomaggiore, Monte di Credito su Pegno di Comacchio and Banca Popolare Cooperativa di Argenta. An Italian law enacted in 1927 requires the savings bank to merge with bigger bank if it was under a certain size.

In December 1991, the bank daily operation and ownership also split into a società per azioni and Fondazione Cassa di Risparmio di Ferrara (Fondazione Carife).

In 1994 the group acquired Banca di Credito Agrario di Ferrara. In 2002 the bank acquired Commercio e Finanza – Leasing e Factoring as well as Banca di Treviso (the latter was sold to Banca Popolare di Marostica in 2010), Banca Popolare di Roma and Credito Veronese (Creverbanca) in 2003. In 2004 the bank acquired Finproget. In 2005 Banca Modenese and Banca Farnese (some branches of the latter was sold to Banca Centropadana in 2014) were acquired. In 2008 Banca di Credito e Risparmio di Romagna joined the banking group. In 2012, Carife would be merged with its subsidiaries: Banca Popolare di Roma, Banca Modenese, Banca di Credito e Risparmio di Romagna and Finproget.

Eventually Banca Popolare di Roma and Banca Modenese became divisions of the bank.

=== Insolvency ===
In 2013 the bank was under special administration by the Ministry of Economy and Finance. The last annual report of the bank shown the group had a shareholders' equity of €374 million, with a Tier 1 capital ratio of 6.41% as at 31 December 2012.

Fondo Interbancario di Tutela dei Depositi had planned to bail-out Banca Marche, Banca Etruria, Carife, and CariChieti for more than €2 billion in late 2015 (€300 million for Carife announced on 6 May, subject to approval from the Bank of Italy and the European Commission), but they were bail-out by Italian National Resolution Fund (Italian: Fondo Nazionale di Risoluzione) instead, for a recapitalization of about €2 billion in total on 22 November. The 4 banks were the first bail-out in Italy since Bank Recovery and Resolution Directive was in force in Italy. The Bank of Italy was the national resolution authority of the Single Resolution Mechanism.

The Italian National Resolution Fund had also injected a further €1.7 billion in total to the 4 banks to cover the losses.

On 3 May 2016, Decree-Law N°59/2016 was announced, which the retail investors of the bond of the 4 banks would be refunded (up to €100,000, same as deposit insurance) if they purchased the bond on or before 12 June 2014, the date of Bank Recovery and Resolution Directive was passed in the European Parliament. The decree-law was a response to criticism of the bail-in of all investor of the bank, which Italian bank often sold risky bond to their depositors. The refund scheme: Fondo di solidarietà, would be managed by FITD.

=== Nuova Carife ===
On 22 November 2015 a "good bank" Nuova Cassa di Risparmio di Ferrara S.p.A. (Nuova Carife), was formed, with a share capital of €191 million. The bank had a Tier 1 Capital ratio of an estimated 9% in a group (consolidated) basis. The bad debt of the old bank was transferred to a single "bad bank" REV - Gestione Crediti, which was shared with Carichieti, Banca Etruria and Banca Marche. While the old bank would be liquidated, which the shareholders and subordinated bond holders would receive nothing due to bail-in.

As of 31 December 2015, the banking group had an equity of €161 million and a CET1 Capital Ratio of 8.22%.

In March 2016 a plan to absorb Commercio e Finanza was announced. Previously it was planned that the ex-subsidiary sold assets and liabilities to Nuova Carife.

On 2 March 2017 BPER Banca signed a contract to acquire Nuova Carife for a nominal fee of €1, with conditions that the national resolution fund recapitalized the bank, as well as selling the non-performing loan to the market. At 31 December 2016 Carife Group had a negative net equity of €66 million, due to heavy loan write-down during 2016 financial year. On 20 June, the bank announced that a gross book value of €343 million NPLs (the net book value after write-down was not disclosed in the press release) were sold to Atlante II and Credito Fondiario for a price equal to around 19% of the gross book value. The bank was also recapitalized by the national resolution fund for €290 million. On 30 June, the takeover was completed.

On 1 July, a plan to absorb Nuova Carife into BPER Banca was announced. It was completed in the same year.

== Shareholders ==
Fondazione Cassa di Risparmio di Ferrara was the owner (54.82%) and parent entity of the old Carife, which took most of the charity function from the bank itself since 1992. Banca Popolare di Cividale and Banca Popolare di Puglia e Basilicata also owned 0.72% and 0.23% shares of old Carife respectively; Banca Popolare di Bari and Banca Valsabbina did not disclosed their ownership ratio, but write-down the value of the shares in 2013 financial year.

As of 31 December 2016, Nuova Carife also owned 1.08815% shares of BP Cividale, 0.36269% shares of BP Puglia e Basilicata, 0.56151% shares of BP Bari and 1.43988% shares of Banca Valsabbina as the relic of previous cross-ownership.

The new Carife was owned by Italian National Resolution Fund (Italian: Fondo Nazionale di Risoluzione) from 2015 to 2017, a transitional fund that would eventually merge into Single Resolution Fund of the European Union.

BPER Banca was the last owner of the bank.

=== Banking foundation ===
Fondazione Cassa di Risparmio di Ferrara known as Fondazione Carife, is an Italian charity organization based in Ferrara. The foundation was the old legal person of the savings bank Cassa di Risparmio di Ferrara, which an Italian banking law required all savings banks had to be incorporated as società per azioni, leaving a separation of the banking activity and charity function 1992.

The foundation was the major shareholder of Cassa di Risparmio di Ferrara until its failure. In 2015, all the shareholders and subordinated bond holders were bail-in the failure of the bank. The foundation had a net assets of €55,140,130 as at 31 December 2014, but including the shares of the bank which had an accounting value of €72,415,205.53.

The foundation had supported the restoration of Santa Maria in Vado, Ferrara as well as a painting by Bastianino in Ferrara Cathedral, and Resurrezione in Oratorio dell'Annunziata, Ferrara.

== Equity investments ==
As of 31 December 2016
banks

- Banca Carim (0.37968%)
- Banca Popolare di Bari (0.56151%)
- Banca Popolare di Cividale (1.08815%)
- Banca Popolare di Puglia e Basilicata (0.36269%)
- Banca Valsabbina (1.43988%)
- Cassa di Risparmio di Cento (0.04975%)
- Cassa di Risparmio di Cesena (0.06257%)
- Istituto Centrale delle Banche Popolari Italiane (0.00094%; sold in 2017)

other companies

- Compagnia Investimenti Sviluppo (0.98490%)
- Interporto di Rovigo (0.56123%)

== See also ==
- Cassa di Risparmio di Cento, savings bank based in Cento, in the Province of Ferrara.
- Cassa di Risparmio in Bologna, a subsidiary of Intesa Sanpaolo
- Cassa di Risparmio di Cesena, a subsidiary of Crédit Agricole Italia
- Cassa di Risparmio di Modena, a predecessor of UniCredit
- Cassa di Risparmio di Parma e Piacenza, also known as Crédit Agricole Italia, a subsidiary of Crédit Agricole
  - Cassa di Risparmio di Piacenza e Vigevano, a predecessor of Cassa di Risparmio di Parma e Piacenza
- Cassa di Risparmio di Ravenna
- Cassa di Risparmio di Reggio Emilia, a predecessor of Capitalia
- Cassa di Risparmio di Rimini (Banca Carim), a subsidiary of Crédit Agricole Italia
- List of banks in Italy
