= Banca Mediterranea =

Former Italian bank based in Potenzacata

- Native name: Nuova Banca Mediterranea S.p.A.
- Formerly: Banca Mediterranea
- Type: subsidiary of a coop company
- Industry: Financial services
- Predecessor: Banca Popolare di Pescopagano; Banca di Lucania
- Founded: 1992; 1 July 2000
- Defunct: 2004
- Successor: Banca Meridiana; branches of BP Bari
- Headquarters: 1 Via Nazario Sauro, Potenza, Italy
- Area served: Basilicata, Apulia and Campania regions
- Services: Retail banking
- Owner: Banca Popolare di Bari
- Parent: Banca Popolare di Bari

Nuova Banca Mediterranea S.p.A. was an Italian bank based in Potenza, Basilicata. The bank was absorbed by Banca Popolare di Bari in 2004.

== History ==
=== Banca Mediterranea ===
Banca Mediterranea S.p.A., based in Pescopagano, in the province of Potenza, was found in 1992 by the merger of Banca Popolare Cooperativa di Pescopagano e Brindisi and Banca di Lucania. At that time BP Pescopagano had about 40 branches and Banca di Lucania 30. In 1994 Banca di Roma acquired 30% stake in the bank.

The two banks at that time had a significant market share in Basilicata and Molise combined (Banca Mediterranea significantly in the province of Potenza, Basilicata and Banca di Roma significantly in the province of Campobasso, Molise). In the lending market (short term, year missing), Banca Mediterranea had a market share of 38.44% (Banca di Roma 2.16%) in Basilicata, comparing to competitors Cassa di Risparmio di Calabria e Lucania (16.07%) and Banco di Napoli (12.67%). In 1994 Banca Mediterranea had 85 branches, 45 in Basilicata, 23 in Apulia, 16 in Campania and 1 in Molise. The acquisition also caused a lengthy legal battle between the bank and the minority shareholders, which in 2014 quantified that the minority shareholders suffered a loss of €12 million.

In 2000 Banca Mediterranea was absorbed into Banca di Roma (which owned 53.09% stake of Banca Mediterranea). At the same time Nuova Banca Mediterranea was formed on 1 July 2000 as a wholly owned subsidiary of Banca di Roma.

=== Nuova Banca Mediterranea ===
Nuova Banca Mediterranea S.p.A. (known as Banca Mediterranea in short) was formed in 2000 in Potenza with 78 branches (out of 87 branches of old Banca Mediterranea).

At that time the bank had a market share of 10.69% in lending in Basilicata region.

In 2001 the bank was sold to Nuova Finanziaria Mediterranea for €284 million, a consortium of Banca Popolare di Bari (59.9%), Veneto Banca (25%) and Cattolica Assicurazioni (15.1%). Veneto Banca later acquired 29 branches from Banca Mediterranea to form Banca Meridiana, as well as sold all the stake in Nuova Finanziaria Mediterranea in 2002.

In 2004 Cattolica Assicurazioni sold the minority interests (20.12%) in Banca Mediterranea to BP Bari for €45,423,716. In the same year the bank was absorbed into the parent company BP Bari.

== See also ==
- Banca Popolare di Puglia e Basilicata
- Banca Apulia
- Banca Carime
- Banco di Napoli
- Banca Popolare di Bari
- Banca Popolare del Mezzogiorno
- Banca di Roma
- List of banks in Italy

== See also ==
- Banca Popolare di Puglia e Basilicata
- Banca Apulia
- Banca Carime
- Banco di Napoli
- Banca Popolare di Bari
- Banca Popolare del Mezzogiorno
- Banca di Roma
- List of banks in Italy
