= Banca Popolare di Vicenza =

- Native name: Banca Popolare di Vicenza S.p.A.
- Type: former cooperative; subsidiary (since 2016); società per azioni (since 2016)
- Industry: Financial services
- Founded: 1866
- Defunct: 2017
- Headquarters: Vicenza, Italy
- Number of locations: ▼541 locations (Dec.2016)
- Area served: 16 regions of Italy; worldwide (Republic of Ireland, New York, São Paulo, Moscow, New Delhi, Hong Kong and Shanghai)
- Key people: Gianni Mion (Chairman); Fabrizio Viola (CEO)
- Services: Retail and corporate banking
- Revenue: ▼€720 million (2016)
- Operating income: ▼€32.6 million (2016)
- Net income: ▼ (€1.902 billion) (2016)
- Total assets: ▼€34.424 billion (2016)
- Total equity: ▼€2.149 billion (2016)
- Owner: Atlante (99.33%)
- Number of employees: ▼5,147 (2016 average)
- Parent: Atlante
Subsidiaries
Banca Nuova	(100%)
FarBanca	(70.77%)
ABC Assicura
Berica Vita
Cattolica Life
- Capital ratio: ▲7.47% (CET1, Dec.2016)
- Rating: Moody's

Banca Popolare di Vicenza (BPVi) was an Italian bank and currently a winding-down company. The banking group along was the 15th-largest retail and corporate bank of Italy by total assets at 31 December 2016, according to Mediobanca. However, its sister bank Veneto Banca also ranked 16th in the same ranking, making the whole banking group that under Atlante, had a higher pro-forma total assets than 10th of the same ranking, Crédit Agricole Italia. Due to its size, BPVi and Veneto Banca were both supervised by the European Central Bank directly, instead of the Bank of Italy.

BPVi was a multi-regional bank which had branches in most of the Italy regions, except Aosta Valley in the north, Molise and Basilicata in the south, as well as Sardinia Island. Moreover, only one branch in Campania, Abruzzo, Marche and only two branches in Apulia, Trentino—South Tyrol and Umbria. The bank had 193 branches in Veneto, 67 in Lombardy, 61 in Tuscany and 50 in Friuli—Venezia Giulia as its core region. Through Banca Nuova, BPVi also had 81 branches in southern Italy (Sicily and Calabria).

The bank, according to a 2015 annual report, was owned by the public of more than 100,000 natural persons (88.5%). Only 11.5% were owned by companies, administrative bodies and institutions, such as Cattolica Assicurazioni (0.89%) and Fondazione Cariprato (0.35%). However, after a bail-out by Atlante, the private equity fund owned 99.33% as at mid-2016. However, the bank required a second bail-out by the Italian Government in 2017, in which the good assets of the bank were acquired by Intesa Sanpaolo for €1, plus the government funding the recapitalization and the cost of closure of branches. The remaining portion of BPVi would be winding-down and being liquidated.

The bank had two major subsidiaries, Banca Nuova, operated mainly in Sicily and Calabria, as well as FarBanca, a bank for pharmacists. The bank expanded in the 1990s by merging with other co-operative Popular Bank (Italian: Banca Popolare) of the whole of Italy.

== History ==
Banca Popolare di Vicenza was the first cooperative bank in Veneto region. The bank was also known as Banca Popolare Vicentina.

=== Acquisitions ===
In 1985 the bank acquired Banca Popolare Agricola di Lonigo, in 1988 Banca Popolare di Thiene, in 1991 Banca Popolare dei Sette Comuni-Asiago, in 1994 Banca Popolare di Venezia, in 1996 Banca Popolare di Castelfranco Veneto (became Banca Popolare della Provincia di Treviso in 1999) and Banca Popolare di Trieste, in 1997 Banca Popolare della Provincia di Belluno, in 1998 Banca Popolare "C. Piva" di Valdobbiadene and Banca Popolare Udinese. The acquisitions at that time were led by chairman Gianni Zonin, and the bank was credited by the news report as "aggregating bank". Zonin remained as the chairman of the bank until 2016, and stepped down after multiple scandals were exposed.

In 2000, the BPVi banking group formed Banca Nuova in Palermo and acquired Banca del Popolo of Trapani, which they merged in 2002. In 2002 the group acquired Cassa di Risparmio di Prato (Cariprato) from Banca Monte dei Paschi di Siena, which had 60 branches mainly in Tuscany region. In 2010 Cariprato was absorbed into the bank.

BPVi was the ninth-largest shareholder of Banca Nazionale del Lavoro (BNL) for 3.63682% ordinary shares (at the end of year 2004). BNL was privatized by BNP Paribas after Bancopoli.

In 2007 61 branches were acquired from UBI Banca, mainly based in the Provinces of Brescia and Bergamo, Lombardy. In 2014, 16 branches were acquired from Cassa di Risparmio di Ferrara as well as one branch in Turin was acquired from Banca Popolare di Spoleto.

=== Alliances ===
The bank was a member of an alliance "North East Group" in the 1980s, which consisted of Banca Agricola Mantovana (BAM), Banca Popolare di Bergamo, Banca Popolare dell'Emilia, Banca Popolare di Sondrio (BPSO), Banca Popolare di Verona and Banca Popolare Vicentina. The group joined with ARCA, which consists of Banca Antoniana, Banca Popolare Commercio e Industria, Banca Popolare di Crema, Banca Popolare di Cremona, Banca Popolare di Lodi and Banca Popolare Veneta in 1989. As at 31 December 2015 BPVi still owned 19.99% stake in ARCA SGR.

The banks of the alliance merged within and outside the alliance to form Banca Antonveneta (1996, acquired by ABN AMRO in 2005), BPU Banca (2003, merged with Banca Lombarda in 2007), Banca Popolare Italiana (BPI, ex-Banca Popolare di Lodi), Banco Popolare di Verona e Novara (2002; merged with BPI in 2007), Banca Popolare dell'Emilia Romagna (BPER Banca; 1992), or acquired by other banking groups (such as BAM). After many years of merger and acquisitions, BPVi, BPER, UBI Banca, Banco Popolare and BPSO were the 5 surviving banking groups, plus Banca Monte dei Paschi di Siena which acquired and absorbed BAM and Antonveneta.

BPVi also signed an agreement with Banca Popolare Veneta (from Padua), Banca Popolare di Asolo e Montebelluna (from the Province of Treviso) and Banca Popolare di Castelfranco Veneto (from the Province of Treviso) on dividing the market of the Province of Padua, Treviso and Vicenza in 1992. However, the regulator Bank of Italy ruled that the agreement was anti-competitive in 1996. After the ruling BPVi acquired Treviso based Banca Popolare di Castelfranco Veneto in 1996 and Banca Popolare "C. Piva" di Valdobbiadene in 1998. The competitors of BPVi in Veneto also became UniCredit (ex-Cariverona Banca), Intesa Sanpaolo (ex-Ambroveneto), Banca Monte dei Paschi di Siena (ex-Antonveneta), Banco Popolare (ex-BP Verona), Veneto Banca (ex-BP Asolo e Montebelluna) and Volksbank – Banca Popolare (ex-Banca Popolare di Marostica) after many merger and acquisitions.

The bank also partnered with Banca di Roma in 2000; however, BPVi breakup with Banca di Roma and did not involve in the birth of Capitalia, which was absorbed by UniCredit in 2007.

BPVi was alliances with insurer Cattolica Assicurazioni until 2016, which the bank still owned 15.07% stake as of 31 December 2015. However, after the failed capital increase of the bank in mid-2016, the insurer terminated the partnership.

=== Recent history ===
The bank was one of the 14 Italian banks that were supervised by the European Central Bank (ECB) directly since 2014 due to their size. The bank was among the four Italian banks (Banca Popolare di Milano (BPM), Banca Carige and Banca Monte dei Paschi di Siena (BMPS) ) that failed the stress tests in 2014. BPVi and BPM passed the tests after recapitalization. In 2014 BPVi also submitted a plan to Banca Popolare dell'Etruria e del Lazio for a possible merger. However, it was rejected.

Due to Decree-Law N°3/2015, in 2016 the bank became a limited company with demutualization. The bank also planned another capital increase of €1.5 billion (the CET1 capital ratio was just 6%, below ECB requirements of 10.25% following the 2015 Supervisory Review and Evaluation Process (SREP), as well as floats the shares in Borsa Italiana. The bank wrote down €1.333 billion worth of customer loans in the 2015 financial year. As part of the demutualization, the bank bought back 271,339 shares for €6.3, a fraction of net equity per shares (about €25 at 31 December 2015) and the offer price of the new shares in 2014 and 2015. However, on the same day, the bank also announced that due to low demand, the new shares would be sold at €3 to €0.1 per share, in order to raise a minimum of €1.51 billion to a maximum of €1.8 billion. The prospects of the initial public offering also exposed that the bank lent money to customers in order to buy the bank's own shares back to 2014 and 2015. With the collapse of the price of the shares, the loan would become non-performing.

Due to low demand on IPO, the entire capital increase of €1.5 billion was subscribed by Atlante, it also due to some subscriptions were automatically canceled due to the bank fail to float in the borsa.

On 13 July 2016 Gianni Mion became the new chairman, as well as confirming Francesco Iorio as CEO.

On 4 August 2016 Cattolica terminated the partnership with BPVi and excised the put option to sell the three joint ventures to the bank. On 5 April 2017, BPVi sold 6.02% shares of Cattolica Assicurazioni for €76.125 million (€7.25 per share).

On 6 December 2016, former BMPS CEO Fabrizio Viola was appointed as new CEO of the bank.

Followed by the announcement of 2016 SREP, which BPVi required to keep a CET1 and Tier 1 ratio of 8.75% and 10.25% respectively (however, the bank did not have additional Tier 1 capital instruments, thus the bank have to keep a de facto 10.25% CET1 capital ratio, same as last year) as well as an undisclosed Pillar 2 guidance, Atlante deposited €310 million for future capital increase, as the bank was just 0.5% higher than the requirement (Tier 1 ratio of 10.75% at 30 June 2016 according to 2016 half-yearly report). On 3 February 2017, BPVi issued a 3-year €3 billion face value bond with the state-guarantee in order to strengthen its capital base. On 20 February, the bank announced that €1.25 billion of the bond were sold to market and the rest were retained by the bank. The bank issued an additional €2.2 billion state-guaranteed bond in May 2017.

On 9 January 2017 the bank offered to buy back the share from retail investors as a part of the settlement of mis-selling (for investors from 2007 to 2016), for €9 per share. As at 30 June 2016 the bank had net assets of €3,211,437 thousands or about €0.2 in terms of net assets per share due to a huge dilute in 2016 capital increase. The NAV was decreased further at 31 December 2016 due to heavy loan write-down. Thus, the price that the bank offered was a favorable one to customers that did not want to seek legal action, as €192.8 million of shares were bought back by the bank from 66,770 shareholders, or 71.9% of shareholders.

In March 2017, BPVi (and sister bank Veneto Banca) requested a "precautionary recapitalization" by the Italian state, as well as a proposal to merge the two banks. A government bank rescue fund had already been set up in December 2016 for €20 billion.

Based on the bank interpretation on the 2016 stress test of the European Central Bank, BPVi along had a capital shortfall of €3.3 billion in the worst forecast scenario (if setting the CET 1 Ratio target even at the worst forecast scenario at 8%). After deducting the contribution from Atlante, the bank seeks investors, including the government for the remaining €2.99 billion shortfall.

=== Liquidation ===
On 23 June 2017, the European Central Bank and the Single Resolution Board determined BPVi and sister bank Veneto Banca were insolvent, but not yet fulfilled the criteria to put the bank in resolution. The two banks would be wound up by the Italian government under Italian laws, into good and bad banks instead. After expressing the interests to acquire some of the good assets (the "good banks") of Veneto Banca and BPVi, a contract was signed on 26 June, between the government and Intesa Sanpaolo. However, FarBanca was excluded from the sales. The European Commission also approved the state aid of Italy to Intesa Sanpaolo for the incentive to close down the branches of the "good banks" (as some of them overlapped with Intesa's network), as well as recapitalized the good banks, for about €4.785 billion on 25 June. As part of the "bail-in" rule, Atlante and other shareholders and subordinated bondholders would receive nothing. However, Intesa also announced that the bank would set up a fund to repay the bonds that were held by small investors.

It was reported that the NPLs of the bank would be sold to Società per la Gestione di Attività by the liquidators, which was a special incorporated "bad bank" for Banco di Napoli and a wholly owned subsidiary of the government.

The whole banking system of Italy had spent over €4 billion in mandatory contribution to the resolution of 4 small banks between 2015 and 2017, with some bank contributing in the FITD voluntary scheme's €280 million "investment" in C.R. Cesena, as well as part of the €3.4 billion "investment" in Atlante bank rescue fund on BPVi and Veneto Banca and BPVi. On 15 June, FITD, one of the two deposit insurance funds by bank mandatory contribution in Italy (voluntary scheme of the fund was funded by voluntary contribution), had said the fund did not have money to rescue as well as the voluntary scheme of the fund would not be activated as there was no agreement between the members of the fund.

== Subsidiaries ==
current

- FarBanca
- PrestiNuova (100%)

former

- Banca Nuova (100%)

== Equity interests ==
- ARCA SGR
- Cattolica Assicurazioni (9.05%)

former

- IMA

== Sponsorship ==
The bank was the main sponsor of Vicenza Calcio (since 2001, shirt sponsor circa 2010) as well as city rival Real Vicenza. The bank also sponsored Udinese Calcio, Pallacanestro Trapani, Trapani Calcio, and U.S. Città di Palermo (all three through Banca Nuova).

== See also ==
- Palazzo Thiene, historic headquarter of BPVi
- Palazzo degli Alberti, historic headquarter of Cariprato
