= Banca Investis =

- Company type: subsidiary of a private company (listed company itself)
- Traded as: BIT: BIM
- ISIN: IT0000074077
- Industry: Financial services
- Founded: 1981
- Headquarters: Turin, Italy
- Key people: Jürgen DENNERT (chairman); Claudio MORO (CEO)Stefano GRASSI (General Manager)
- Products: private banking
- Owner: Trinity Investment Designated Activity Company (86.32%) treasury stock (0,93%) official web site
- Subsidiaries: BIM Vita; Symphonia SGR; Bim Insurance Brokers; Bim Fiduciaria

Banca Intermobiliare di Investimenti e Gestioni S.p.A. known as Banca Intermobiliare or just BIM is a Turin-based wealth management bank.

== History ==
Banca Intermobiliare (BIM) was majority owned by Veneto Banca, an unlisted cooperative bank (People's Bank) that was bail-out by a private equity fund Atlante in 2016. In 2017, Veneto Banca was declared insolvent and under administrative liquidation (Italian: L.C.A.). Intesa Sanpaolo, the largest bank of Italy by capitalization, bought most of the good assets of Veneto Banca and their sister bank Banca Popolare di Vicenza (BPVi) on 26 June 2017. However, Banca Intermobiliare and sister bank FarBanca (of BPVi group) were excluded. On 6 July 2017, Veneto Banca made an open invitation to sell Banca Intermobiliare. In September 2018, Banca Intermobiliare approved the strategic plan for three-year (2019-2021).

After being taken private, the bank was restructured and renamed Banca Investis in 2022.
