= Popolo =

Popolo means People, may refer to:

- Piazza del Popolo
- Basilica of Santa Maria del Popolo
- Banca del Popolo (disambiguation), various Italian bank

== See also ==
- People (disambiguation)
