= Ghizzoni =

Ghizzoni is an Italian surname. Notable people with the surname include:

- Federico Ghizzoni (born 1955), Italian businessman and banker
- Paolo Ghizzoni, bishop in Roman Catholic Diocese of San Miniato
- Serafino Ghizzoni (born 1954), Italian international rugby union footballer
