= Banca Apulia =

Italian banking company

- Trade name: BancApulia
- Native name: Banca Apulia S.p.A.
- Company type: Subsidiary; Società per Azioni
- ISIN: IT0000312071
- Industry: Financial services
- Founded: 1924 in Torremaggiore; 1996 in San Severo (Banca Apulia)
- Headquarters: 40 Via Tiberio Solis, San Severo, Italy
- Services: Retail and corporate banking
- Net income: ▼ (€119.867 million) (2014)
- Total assets: ▲€5.495 billion (2014)
- Total equity: ▼€213.176 million (2014)
- Owner: Intesa Sanpaolo (70.414%); Finanziaria Capitanata
- Parent: Intesa Sanpaolo
- Subsidiaries: Apulia Prontoprestito (JV with the parent); Apulia Previdenza (100%)
- Capital ratio: 6.56% (CET1)
- Website: www.bancapulia.it
- Footnotes / references in consolidated basis

Banca Apulia S.p.A. marketed as BancApulia is an Italian bank incorporated in San Severo, in the Province of Foggia, Apulia region (Italian: Puglia). The main office of the bank was located in Bari, in the centre of Apulia region instead. The bank was takeover by Intesa Sanpaolo, after the previous owner was under administration and then being liquidated.

== History ==
Banca Apulia S.p.A. was found in Torremaggiore on 24 March 1924 under the name Banco di Torremaggiore, later changing its name to Banco di Torremaggiore e della Daunia spa, then to Banco di Torremaggiore e San Severo spa. Felice Chiro’ was chairman from 1966 to 1998. In the early 1980s he appointed a young bank manager and they led the growth of the bank for the following years. The bank experienced a significant growth from the 1980s to 2006 under the CEO Tommaso Gozzetti who received an honorary degree from Foggia University for it. The foundations were laid for the bank's regional growth, which in 1985 took the name Banca della Capitanata S.p.A. In 1996, the bank acquired Banca Agricola Salentina, grew in size and changed its name again to BancApulia S.p.A. with its registered office in San Severo; this change was also reflected in the logo, which became Castel del Monte. In 1996 the bank was renamed as Banca Apulia after absorbing Banca Agricola Salentina.

In 2005 the bank had a market share of lending in Apulia for 5.47%, primary direct deposits for 4.42% and 2.32% in terms of branches, according to Banca d'Italia.

In 2008 the bank was controlled by Finanziaria Capitanata (52.54% stake).

On 13 January 2010 Veneto Banca acquired 42.394% stake in the bank from Finanziaria Capitanata and other shareholders. In mid-2010 Banca Meridiana, a subsidiary of Veneto Banca, was absorbed by Banca Apulia. As at 31 December 2010 Veneto Banca owned 50.787% stake. (increased to 63.747% in 2011 and 70.105% in 2012) After the deals, Finanziaria Capitanata remain as a minority owner for 25.85% stake.

In 2012 Veneto Banca and BancApulia purchased the minority stake of Apulia Prontoprestito, a subsidiary of BancApulia, from HDI Assicurazioni and other shareholders from Borsa Italiana. After the deal Vento Banca owned 13.079% and BancApulia owned 86.921%. The subsidiary was specialising in salary-backed loans.

On 26 June 2017, as part of a government funded bail-out of depositors and bail-in of the investors of Veneto Banca, Intesa Sanpaolo, the second largest bank of Italy by total assets, acquired some good assets of Veneto Banca as well as BancApulia.

In January 2019, Intesa Sanpaolo deposited a plan of merger by incorporation of Banca Apulia into the company.

== See also ==
- Banca Popolare di Bari, an Italian bank based in Bari, Apulia
- Banca Popolare di Puglia e Basilicata, an Italian bank based in Altamura, Apulia
- Banca Popolare Pugliese, an Italian bank based in Parabita, in the Province of Lecce, Apulia
- Banco di Napoli, an Italian bank serving southern Italy, a subsidiary of Intesa Sanpaolo

- Banca della Campania, a defunct subsidiary of Banca Popolare dell'Emilia Romagna
- Banca Carime, a defunct subsidiary of UBI Banca which served southern Italy
- Banca di Roma, a defunct subsidiary of UniCredit which had network in southern Italy
- Banca Cattolica di Molfetta, an Italian bank based in Molfetta, Apulia, a defunct subsidiary of Banca Antonveneta
- Banca Popolare del Mezzogiorno, a defunct subsidiary of Banca Popolare dell'Emilia Romagna
