= Banca Teatina =

Defunct Italian bank

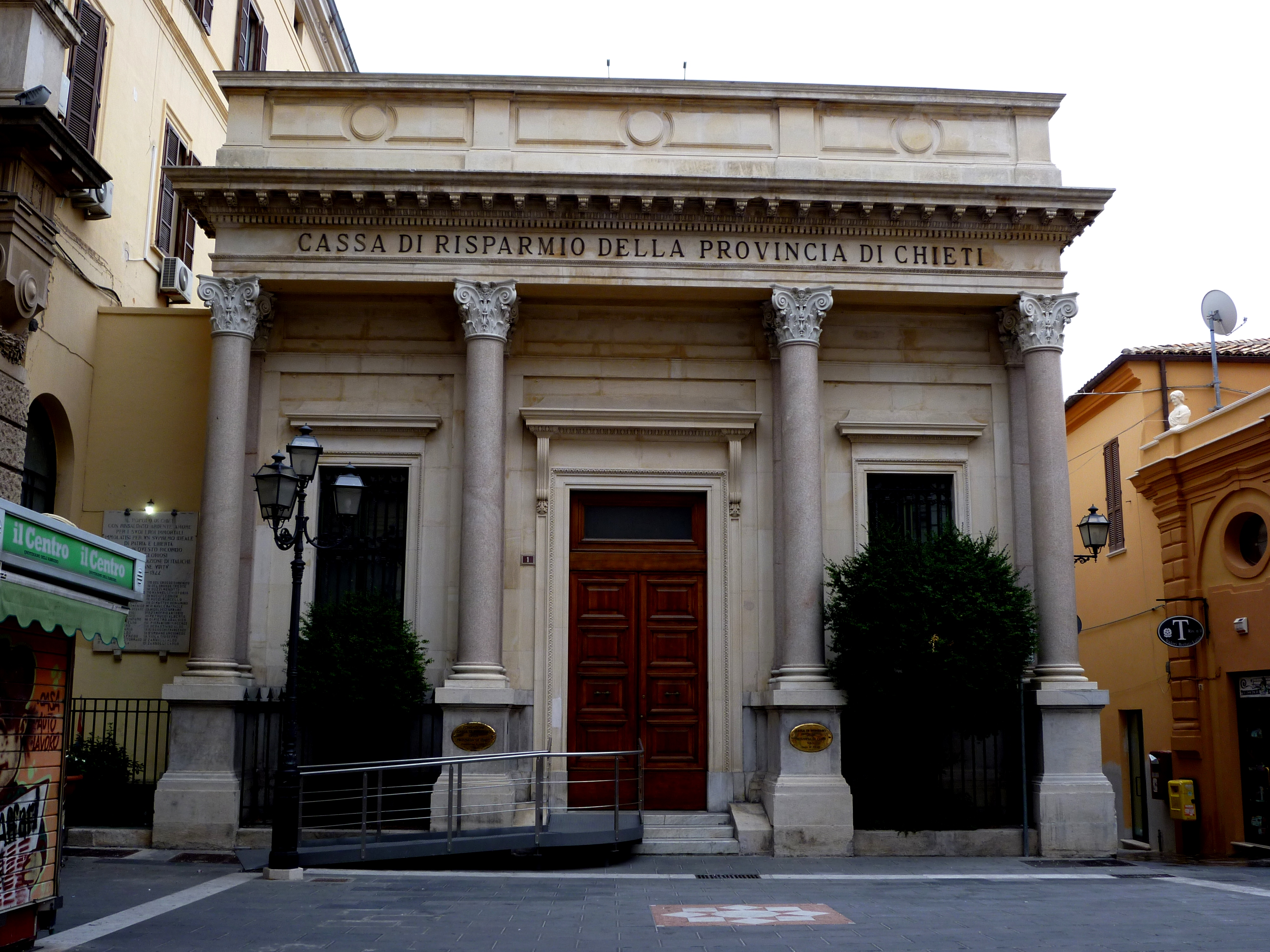
- Former head office in Chieti
- Formerly: Nuova Cassa di Risparmio di Chieti
- Company type: Subsidiary
- Industry: Financial services
- Predecessor: Cassa di Risparmio Marrucina; Cassa di Risparmio di Guardiagrele; Cassa di Risparmio della Provincia di Chieti
- Founded: 1862 (C.R. Marrucina); 1938 (Marrucina & Guardiagrele merged); 1992 (S.p.A. and Foundation spin-off); 2015 (re-founded)
- Founder: Fondazione Chieti in 1992; Bank of Italy in Rome in 2015
- Defunct: 26 February 2018
- Fate: Became UBI Banca branches
- Successor: Fondazione Chieti (charity only)
- Headquarters: Chieti Scalo, Chieti, Italy (de facto); Bergamo, Italy (registered office)
- Number of locations: 63 branches (filiali) (2016)
- Area served: Abruzzo Region; Rome, Perugia, San Benedetto del Tronto and Milan (cities outside Abruzzo)
- Key people: Osvaldo Ranica (chairman); Raffaele Avantaggiato (CEO)
- Services: Retail and corporate banking
- Net income: ▲€8 million (2016)
- Total assets: ▼€2.965 billion (2016)
- Total equity: ▲€119 million (2016)
- Owner: UBI Banca (100%)
- Number of employees: ▼548 (2016)
- Parent: UBI Banca
- Capital ratio: ▲11.29% (CET1, Dec.2016)
- Website: www.carichieti.it
- Footnotes / references source

Banca Teatina S.p.A. formerly known as Nuova Cassa di Risparmio di Chieti S.p.A. was an Italian savings bank headquartered in Chieti Scalo, Chieti, Abruzzo region. The bank was formed on 22 November 2015 to replace the old Cassa di Risparmio della Provincia di Chieti S.p.A. which was under special administration from 2014 to 2015. The bank was bought by UBI Banca on 18 January 2017 for a nominal fee. Cassa di Risparmio della Provincia di Chieti S.p.A. was the successor of the bank that known as "Cassa di Risparmio della Provincia di Chieti", which was under legal reconstruction in the 1990s. The former legal entity of "Cassa di Risparmio della Provincia di Chieti" became Fondazione Cassa di Risparmio della Provincia di Chieti, which was the majority shareholder of the S.p.A. before its failure in 2015.

== History ==
Cassa di Risparmio della Provincia di Chieti was found in 1938 by the merger of Cassa di Risparmio Marrucina (found 1862) and Cassa di Risparmio di Guardiagrele.

In 1992, Due to Legge Amato, the statutory corporation was split into a "company limited by shares" Cassa di Risparmio della Provincia di Chieti S.p.A. (in short Carichieti S.p.A.), and a banking foundation Fondazione Cassa di Risparmio della Provincia di Chieti ("Fondazione Chieti" in short). The foundation was the owner of Carichieti S.p.A. for 80%, with Cariplo owned 20%. Cariplo also owned 20% shares of Abruzzo savings banks Caripe and Tercas.

Intesa Sanpaolo, as the successor of Cariplo, still owned a minority interests in the bank until 2014 bankruptcy.

=== Insolvency ===
The company was under special administration (A.S.) from 2014. The last annual report of the bank, shown the bank had a shareholders' equity of €200 million and a Tier 1 capital ratio of 8.80% as at 31 December 2013. The administrator from the Bank of Italy had made asset quality review, forcing the bank to make more provision to their non-performing loans.

In 2015 one of the two Italian deposit guarantee fund Fondo Interbancario di Tutela dei Depositi (which most of the banks except BCC banking group belongs to) had planned to bail-out CariChieti and 3 other banks that were also under A.S., but they were bail-out by Italian National Resolution Fund instead, for a recapitalisation of €2 billion (€141 million for CariChieti). The European Commission ruled that the bail out of Banca Tercas by FITD in 2014 was a state aid, while new Bank Recovery and Resolution Directive of EU required to bail-in some investors of the bank before any state intervention.

The Italian National Resolution Fund had also injected a combined €1.7 billion to Banca Marche, Banca Etruria, Carife, and CariChieti to cover the losses. After forming the good bank and the bad bank, the old bank would be liquidated, which the shareholders and subordinated bond holders of the old bank would receive nothing due to bail-in. After the bail-in, the banking foundation had a net assets of just €11 million (decreased from €89 million) at 31 December 2015, due to the total write-off of the value of the shares of the old bank.

On 3 May 2016, Decree-Law N°59/2016 was announced, which the retail investors of the bond of the 4 banks would be refunded (up to €100,000, same as deposit insurance) if they purchased the bond on or before 12 June 2014, the date of Bank Recovery and Resolution Directive was passed. The decree-law was a response to criticism of the bail-in of all junior investor of the bank, which Italian bank often sold risky bond of themselves to their depositors. The refund scheme: Fondo di solidarietà, would be managed by FITD.

=== Nuova Carichieti / Banca Teatina ===
On 22 November 2015 the bank split into a "good" and "bad bank", the foundation lost the control on the company, which had no assets but share capital and subordinated debt. The new bank had a share capital of €141 million and a Tier 1 capital ratio of estimated 9%. While the bad loans were transferred to a single "bad bank" REV - Gestione Crediti, which was shared with Carife, Banca Etruria and Banca Marche. The transfer was completed in January 2016. The rescue of the four banks was in line with EU Bank Recovery and Resolution Directive, which the Bank of Italy was the national resolution authority of the Single Resolution Mechanism. At 31 December 2015, CariChieti had a net equity of €117 million and a CET1 ratio of 9.53%.

On 12 January 2017, UBI Banca made a biding bid of a nominal €1 for Nuova CariChieti, Nuova Banca Etruria and Nuova Banca Marche. The banking group also requested conditions that the balance sheets of the three banks would be cleaned up before the completion of the deal (which was done by selling NPLs to Atlante II and Credito Fondiario) as well as recapitalized the banks for an estimated €450 million (eventually €713 million). On 18 January the bid was accepted. On 10 May, the transaction was completed, which Nuova CariChieti was renamed to Banca Teatina (effective in September). On the same day, a plan to merge the 3 banks into UBI Banca was also announced.

== Banking foundation ==
The bank, previously a subsidiary of Fondazione Chieti – Abruzzo e Molise, was spun off from its former largest shareholder. It still operates as a charity organization. Due to the bail-in of all the equity investment in the bank, As of 31 December 2016 the foundation owned a net assets of €11 million, comparing to €89 million in 2014.

== Gallery ==
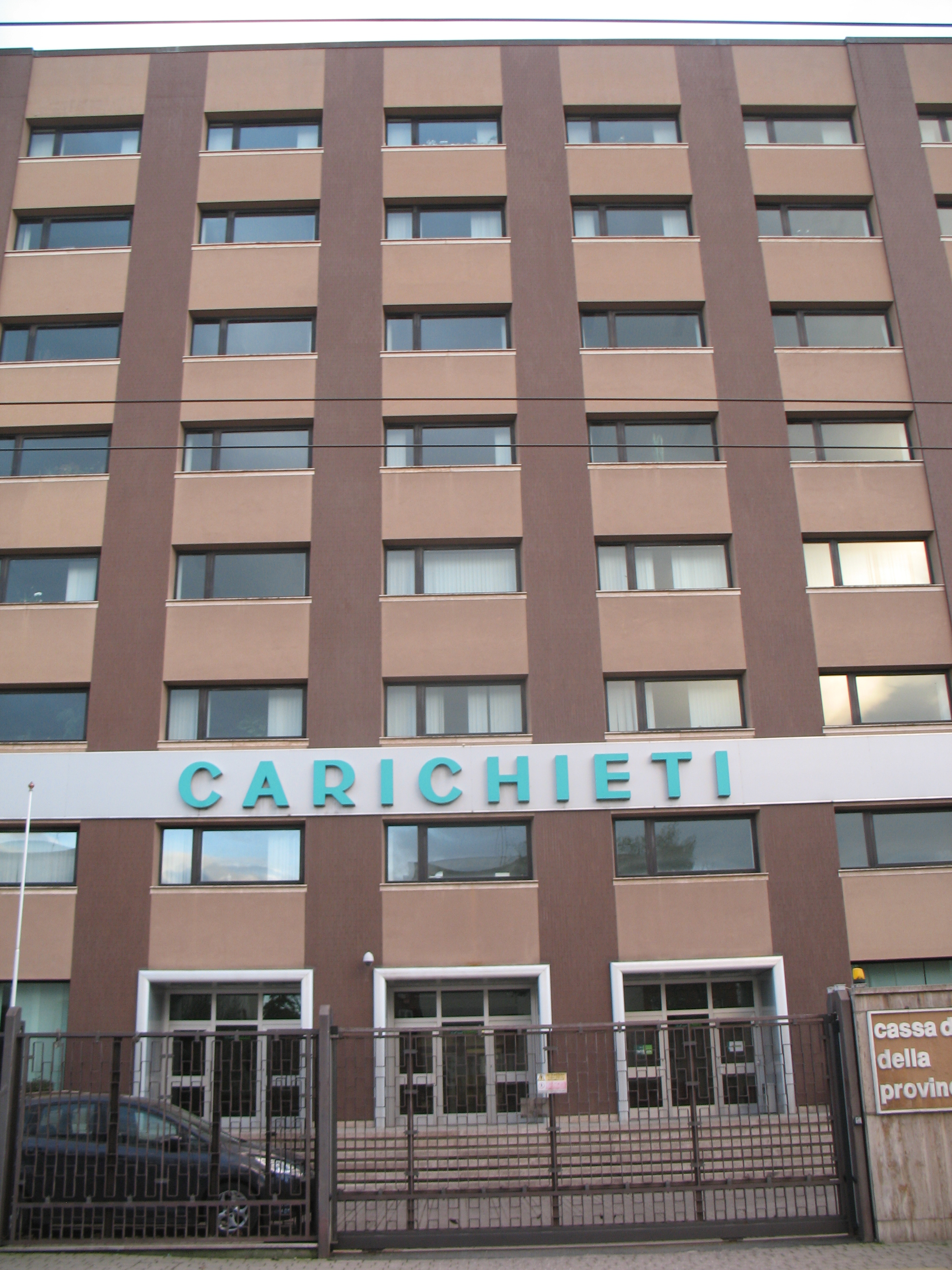
Headquarters in Chieti

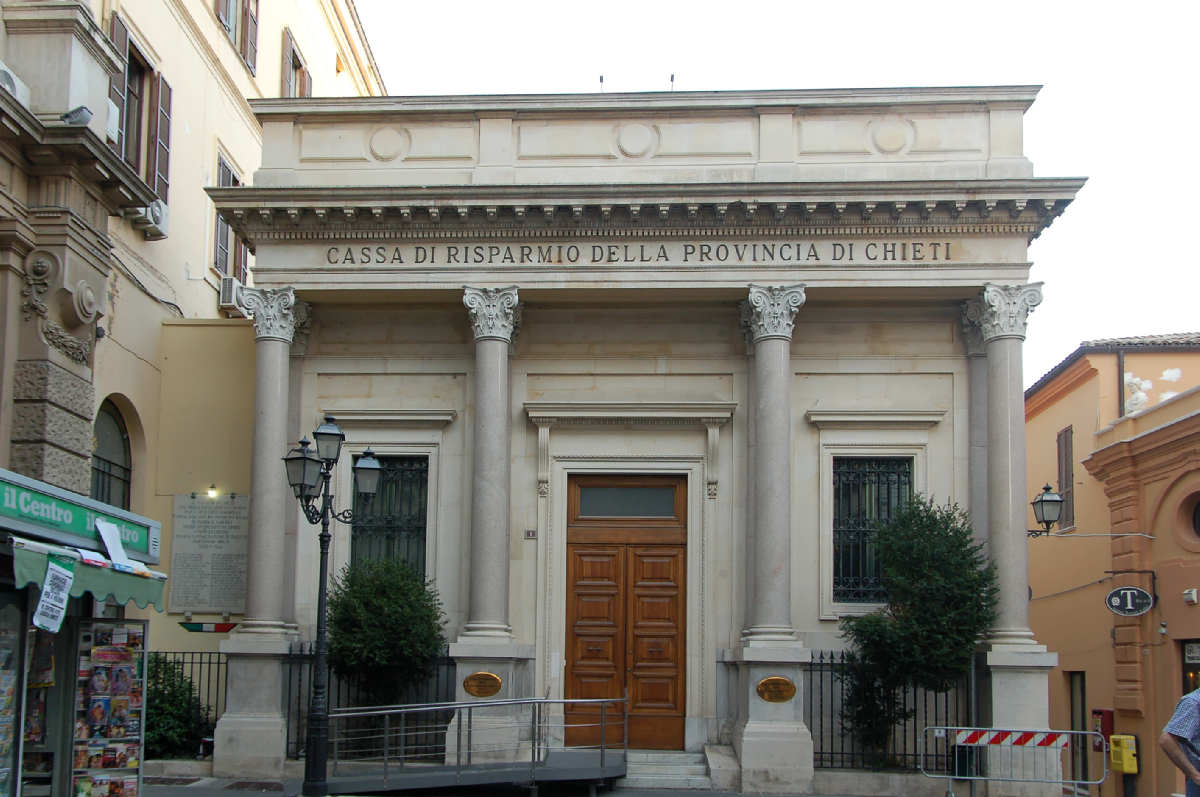
The old headquarters

former logo

== See also ==
- Banca Tercas – absorbed by Banca Popolare di Bari
- Banca Caripe – absorbed by Banca Popolare di Bari
- Cassa di Risparmio della Provincia dell'Aquila – absorbed by BPER Banca
- List of banks in Italy
