= Piero Gnudi =

Italian politician

Pierro Gnudi
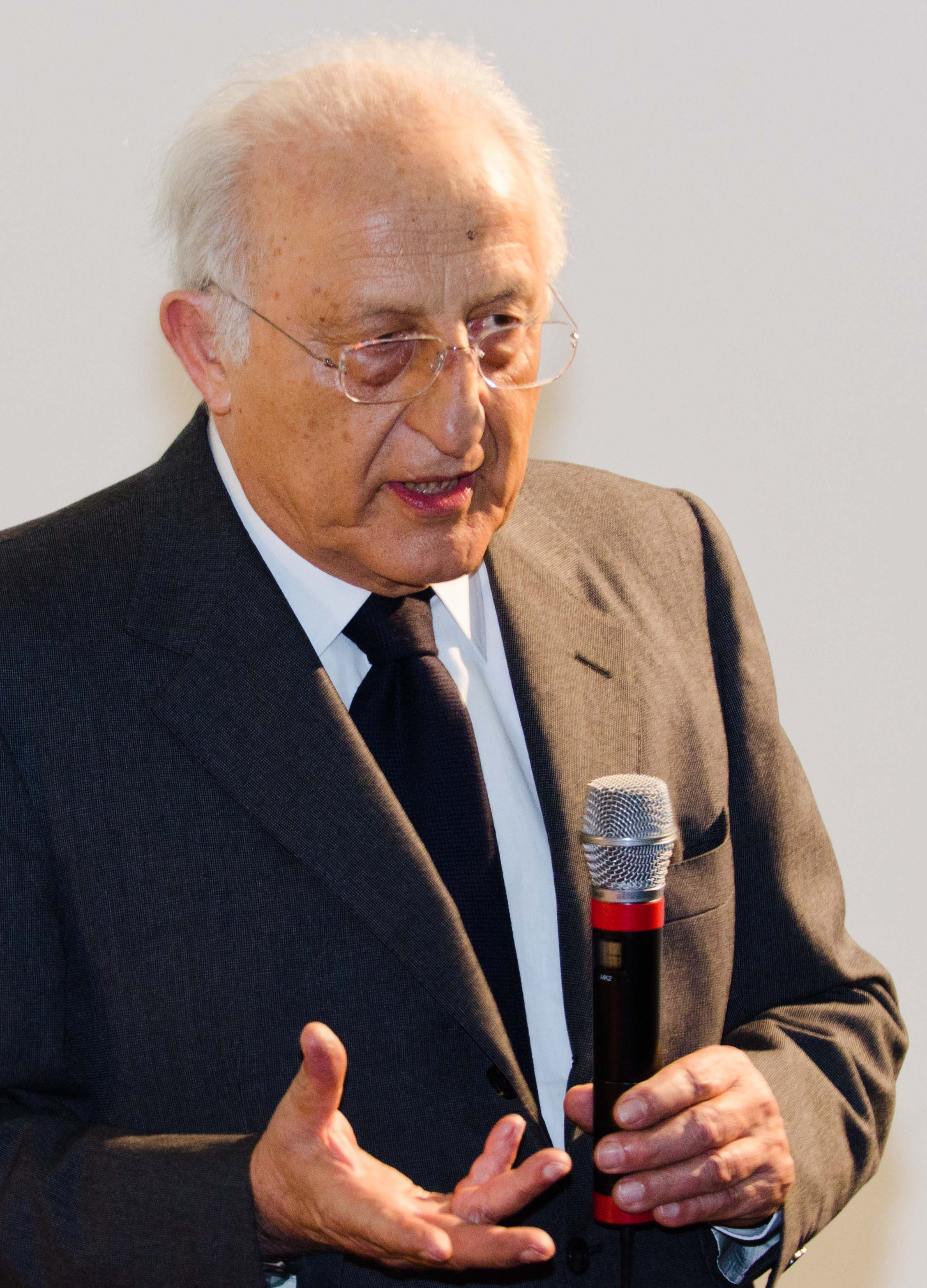

Minister of Tourism, Sport and Regional Affairs
- In office 16 November 2011 – 28 April 2013
- Prime Minister: Mario Monti

Personal details
- Born: 17 May 1938 (age 88) Bologna
- Party: Independent
- Education: University of Bologna

Piero Gnudi (born 17 May 1938) is an Italian tax advisor, manager and politician. He served as Italy's minister of tourism and sport in the Monti cabinet from 16 November 2011 to April 2013.

== Early life and education ==
Piero Gnudi was born on 17 May 1938 in Bologna, Italy. He graduated from the University of Bologna with a degree in economics and commerce in 1962.

== Career ==
Gnudi is a board member of Confindustria, Eni, Enichem, Stet, Merloni, Ferré, Beghelli, Irce, and Unicredit. He sits on the steering committee of Assonime and the executive committee of the Aspen Institute. He is also the chairman of Profingest, Credito Fondiario (Fonspa) and vice president of Alma Graduate School. He was the board chairman of Enel from May 2002 to April 2011. He has also been the president of Rai Holding, Locat, and Astaldi. He is member of the Italy-USA Foundation.

He was appointed minister of tourism and sport on 16 November 2011. His term ended on 28 April 2013.
