= Fabrizio Viola =

Italian banker (born 1958)

Fabrizio Viola (born in 1958 in Rome) is an Italian banker.

== Biography ==
Fabrizio Viola is a graduate in business administration from the Bocconi University.

From 1990 to 2011, he held various positions at the IMI Group, the Fondiaria Group and the Banca Popolare di Vicenza. From 2004 to 2008, he was the CEO of the Banca Popolare di Milano.

From May 2012 to 2016, he was the CEO and general manager of Banca Monte dei Paschi di Siena, the oldest bank in the world. He was later employed by Banca Popolare di Vicenza as CEO and sister bank Veneto Banca as director. After the banks were in liquidation, Viola was assigned as one of the liquidator. In February 2018, he became a senior advisor for the Boston Consulting Group.

Starting in 2015, he was under investigation for alleged false accounting and market manipulation during his tenure as CEO of Banca Monte dei Paschi di Siena. He 2020, he was found guilty of those charges.

On October 15, 2020, the Milan court sentenced Profumo and Viola to six years in prison in the first instance and ordered each of them to pay a fine of 2.5 million euros. On December 11, 2023, the Milan Court of Appeal decided to acquit Profumo and Viola of the charges of false accounting and market manipulation because "the fact does not exist."
