= Veneto Banca =

- Formerly: Banca Popolare di Montebelluna; Banca Popolare di Asolo e Montebelluna
- Type: unlisted public Società per Azioni
- Industry: Financial services
- Founded: 1877
- Defunct: 23 June 2017; 9 years ago
- Fate: bankruptcy, compulsory liquidation
- Successor: "bad bank" of Veneto Banca; branches of Intesa Sanpaolo
- Headquarters: Montebelluna, Italy
- Number of locations: ▼550 branches (2015)
- Services: Retail and corporate banking
- Net income: ▼ (€1.502 billion) (2016)
- Total assets: ▼€28.078 billion (2016)
- Total equity: ▼€1.743 billion (2016)
- Number of employees: 5,703 (2015 average)
Subsidiaries
Banca Intermobiliare	(71.413%)
- Capital ratio: ▼6.39% (Group CET1, Dec.2016)
- Rating: Moody's
- Website: gruppovenetobanca.it

Veneto Banca S.p.A. is a former Italian bank headquartered in Montebelluna, Italy and currently a wind-down unit.

The bank changed from a cooperative society to a limited company in December 2015. Following a failed stock market listing in June 2016 it was taken over by a bail-out fund, Atlante. However, after a heavy loan write-down in the 2016 financial year, as well as a scandal on selling own new shares to depositors in the past, European Central Bank announced the bank was insolvent on 23 June 2017, and would be broken up (wound up) into a good and a bad bank. Intesa Sanpaolo, the largest bank of Italy by capitalization, announced that it would be interested in buying certain good assets (and corresponding liabilities) of the bank for a token fee. A contract to acquire the "good bank" (excluding Banca Intermobiliare) was signed on 26 June, after the European Commission approved the state aid of Italy to Intesa Sanpaolo for increasing the capital ratio of the "good bank" on 25 June.

According to a research by Ricerche e Studi, the bank was ranked 16th by total assets, using 2015 data. The bank was one of the fourteen largest banks of Italy, which were supervised by the European Central Bank directly.

== History ==
Established in 1877 as Banca Popolare di Montebelluna, in the 1960s the bank started its expansion acquiring some local cooperative banks and savings banks, such as Banca Popolare di Intra. An intense development stage starts in 2000, with the expansion in North-West and Southern Italy and the acquiring of banks in Eastern Europe.

In 2001–2002 Veneto Banca acquired 29 branches of Nuova Banca Mediterranea from Banca di Roma, which were immediately injected to Banca Meridiana (ex-Banca Popolare del Levante). Banca Meridiana was merged with Banca Apulia, another subsidiary of Veneto Banca in 2010. In 2010s Veneto Banca acquired Cassa di Risparmio di Fabriano e Cupramontana (CARIFAC), mostly based in Marche Region and also in Umbria Region and in Rome.

The banks was one of the fourteen largest banks of Italy, which were supervised by European Central Bank directly. The bank passed the stress test by recapitalization in 2014.

=== Demutualization, Atlante bail-out and insolvency ===
Due to Decree-Law N°3/2015, the bank changed from a cooperative limited partnership (Italian: Società cooperativa per Azioni) to Società per Azioni (company limited by shares) in December 2015, affecting the calculation of voting rights (every shareholders had one vote regardless how many shares he had in cooperative society). The Decree-Law required People's Bank with more than €8 billion total assets, had to registered as limited company instead. Veneto also bought back €14,725,910.40 shares (€7.3 per share) as part of the demutualization.

Logo of the Albania branch

The bank also planned to recapitalize €1 billion in early 2016 (due to CET1 ratio was below ECB requirement, set at 10.25%% after 2015 Supervisory Review and Evaluation Process (SREP)), as well as planning to list in the Borsa Italiana in mid-2016. As at 31 March 2016 the bank had a net assets per share of about €15.5, or €3 in nominal value. However, due to low demand of the new shares, the bank priced the new share at €0.5 to €0.1 per share. The stock market listing failed to generate interest, with only one institutional investor taking up the offer and existing shareholders buying just 2.2% (some of them excised rights of withdrew at a later time). As a result, the newly created bail-out fund (created by banking sector in voluntary basis), Atlante, which had underwritten the share issue (previously underwritten by Intesa Sanpaolo), became the majority shareholder, which subscribed €988,582,329.50 out of €1 billion new shares of the bank, making the private sector led bail out fund owned 97.64% shares of the bank. The bank's CET1 ratio was increased to an estimated 11% immediately after the capital increase, despite decreased to 10.74% on 30 June 2016.

However, the bank capital base was deteriorated further due to more write-down on non-performing loans (NPLs), as well as 2016 SREP maintained the requirement on Tier 1 capital ratio for 10.25%, plus unpublished capital recommendation (pillar II guidance). According to the bank, the bank's Tier 1 ratio on 30 June 2016 was 10.74%, just 0.49% higher than requirement. In January 2017, Atlante deposited €628 million as future capital increase. On 2 February 2017 the bank issued €3.5 billion bond with state-guarantee, which would matured in 2019 and 2020 respectively, in order to improve its capital base. A further €1.4 billion state-guaranteed bond were issued on 1 June 2017.

On 9 January 2017 Veneto Banca offered to buy back the shares that were sold from 2007 to 2016 for 15% of the original price, despite the net asset value per unit of those shares had already diluted significantly due to 2016 capital increase. The bank wanted to buy back the shares in order to avoid high legal cost on settlement on accused mis-selling of shares to retail investors and savers. On 11 April, the bank announced that 54,374 shareholders had accepted the offer (around 72.6% of the total number of shareholders), for €248.5 million.

On 17 March 2017, Veneto Banca (and sister bank Banca Popolare di Vicenza (BPVi)) requested a "precautionary recapitalization" by the Italian state. A government bank rescue fund had already set up in December 2016 for €20 billion.

At the same time, the new business plan for year 2017–2021 was announced. Veneto Banca would seek the opportunity to merge with sister bank BPVi. Fabrizio Viola, chairman of BPVi, was also the member of the board of directors of Veneto Banca. However, based on the capital shortfall that forecast by 2016 bank stress test by European Central Bank, Veneto Banca along had a capital shortfall of €3.1 billion in the worst forecast scenario (if setting the CET 1 Ratio target even at worst forecast scenario at 8%). After deducting the contribution from Atlante, the bank seek investor including the government for the remaining €2.472 billion shortfall.

On 3 April, the draft annual report was approved by the board of directors. If excluding the deposit of Atlante for the future capital increase, despite the drop on risk-weighed assets, the greater drop in the capital making the bank had a CET1 ratio (at group level) of just 6.39%, even worse than the level in December 2015 due to heavy loan write-down.

In mid-2017, it was reported that European Central Bank requested the bank have to seek private sector to recapitalize the bank first, in order to reach the solvent criteria for a "precautionary recapitalization" by the Italian Government. However, the major shareholder Atlante had stated that the fund had run out of money to invest, as well as the shareholders behind the fund, the major banks of Italy refused to invest further.

=== Liquidation ===
On 23 June 2017, the European Central Bank and the Single Resolution Board determined Veneto Banca and sister bank BPVi were insolvent, but not yet fulfilled the criteria to put the bank in resolution by the board. The two banks would be wound up by Italian government under Italian laws, into good and bad banks instead. After expressing the interests to acquire some of the good assets (the "good banks") of Veneto Banca and BPVi, a contract was signed on 26 June. However, Banca Intermobiliare was excluded from the sales. European Commission also approved the state aid of Italy to Intesa Sanpaolo for the incentive to close down the branches of the "good banks" (as some of them overlapped with Intesa's network), as well as recapitalized the good banks, for about €4.785 billion on 25 June. As part of the "bail-in" rule, Atlante and other shareholders and subordinated bondholders would receive nothing. However, Intesa also announced that the bank would set up a fund to repaid the bonds that were held by small investors.

The whole banking system of Italy had spent over €4 billion in mandatory contribution to the resolution of 4 small banks between 2015 and 2017, with some bank contributed in FITD voluntary scheme's €280 million "investment" in C.R. Cesena, as well as part of the €3.4 billion "investment" in Atlante bank rescue fund on BPVi and Veneto Banca and BPVi. On 15 June, FITD, one of the two deposit insurance fund by bank mandatory contribution (voluntary scheme by voluntary contribution), had said the fund did not have money to rescue (The Economist said it would be €12.5 billion) as well as the voluntary scheme of the fund would not be activated as there was no agreement between the members of the fund.

== Subsidiaries ==
- Banca Intermobiliare
- Eximbank

== Former subsidiaries ==
- Banca Apulia, sold to Intesa Sanpaolo by the liquidator
- Banca di Bergamo, absorbed by the bank
- Banca Meridiana, absorbed by the bank
- Banca Popolare di Intra, absorbed by the bank
- Banca Popolare di Monza e Brianza, absorbed by the bank
- Cassa di Risparmio di Fabriano e Cupramontana, based in Fabriano, Marche, absorbed by the bank

== Equity investments ==
- ARCA SGR (19.999%)

former

- Banca Consulia (formerly known as Banca IPIBI) (25.52%)

== See also ==
- List of banks in Italy
