= Banca Popolare dell'Alto Lazio =

Banca Popolare dell'Alto Lazio S.c.r.l. was an Italian cooperative bank based in Rome, Lazio.

The bank was created as a result of the merger of Banca Federale di Amatrice (founded 1917), Banca Popolare Sabina di Poggio Mirteto e Casperia (founded 1884), Banca Mutua Popolare Maglianese (1887) and Banca Popolare di Civitavecchia (founded 1963) on 23 December 1974.

The bank had 12 branches in addition to its headquarters in Rome. It had deposits (Italian: massa fiduciaria) of 450,226,481,885 lire in 1988.

It merged with Banca Popolare dell'Etruria on 31 December 1988. It was ranked the 222nd according to a research by Mediobanca.

== See also ==
- List of banks in Italy

== See also ==
- Banca Popolare del Frusinate, a bank based in Frosinone, Lazio region
- Banca Popolare del Lazio, a bank based in Velletri, Lazio region
