= Banca Popolare Pugliese =

- Native name: Banca Popolare Pugliese S.C.p.A.
- Company type: Società Cooperativa per Azioni
- ISIN: IT0001036760
- Industry: Financial services
- Predecessor: Banca Popolare Sud Puglia; Banca Popolare di Lecce
- Founded: 2 June 1994
- Headquarters: 5 via Provinciale per Matino, Parabita, Italy (legal); 8 via Luzzatti, Matino, Italy (general office)
- Number of locations: 96 locations (2014)
- Area served: Apulia region (mainly in Lecce and Brindisi provinces); Matera, Basilicata region; Campobasso, Molise region
- Services: Retail and corporate banking
- Net income: ▲€10,591,772 (2014)
- Total assets: ▼€3,392,713,038 (2014)
- Total equity: ▲€344,372,171 (2014)
- Owner: ▲32,888 individuals
- Capital ratio: 13.47% (CET1)
- Website: Official website (in Italian)
- Footnotes / references source

Banca Popolare Pugliese S.C.p.A. (BPP) is an Italian cooperative bank based in Parabita and Matino, in the province of Lecce, Apulia region.

Despite named itself Apulian Popular Bank, the bank concentrated in the provinces of Lecce (50 branches) and Brindisi (15 branches) in Apulia, as well as two branches in Basilicata region and once branch in Molise region.

The bank also had 11 branches in the province of Bari, 7 branches in the province of Foggia, 6 branches in the province of Taranto, 2 branches in the province of Barletta-Andria-Trani, plus 4 cash machines in the two headquarters, in Otranto and in Torre San Giovanni (both in the province of Lecce).

== History ==
Banca Popolare Pugliese S.C.p.A. was found on 2 June 1994 by the merger of Banca Popolare Sud Puglia (based in Matino) and Banca Popolare di Lecce (ex-Banca Popolare di Parabita e Aradeo). At the time BP Sud Puglia had a market share (in terms of deposits) of 2.8% in Apulia (especially 15.6% in Lecce and 5.6% in Brindisi), while BP Lecce had 1.6% in Apulia (especially 8.4% in Lecce and 3.3% in Brindisi). Their competitors Banco di Napoli and Banca Nazionale del Lavoro had 14% and 8% in Apulia respectively (data excluding the province of Foggia, as it was intended to compare to the geographical area of Banca Popolare Pugliese's network).

In 2007 the bank acquired 15 branches from Banca Carime, a subsidiary of UBI Banca.

In 2015 BPP acquired 97.37% stake in Banca del Lavoro e del Piccolo Risparmio di Benevento, which operates in 7 different locations in 6 comuni (two in Benevento).

== Subsidiaries ==
- Banca del Lavoro e del Piccolo Risparmio di Benevento

== See also ==
- Banca Popolare di Bari, an Italian bank based in Bari, Apulia
- Banca Popolare di Puglia e Basilicata, an Italian bank based in Altamura, in the province of Bari, Apulia
- Banca Apulia, an Italian bank based in San Severo, in the province of Foggia, Apulia, a subsidiary of Veneto Banca
- Banco di Napoli, an Italian bank serving south Italy, a subsidiary of Intesa Sanpaolo
- Banca Carime, an Italian bank serving south Italy, a subsidiary of UBI Banca
- Banca di Roma, a defunct subsidiary of UniCredit
- Banca del Salento – Credito Popolare Salentino, a defunct subsidiary of Banca Monte dei Paschi di Siena
- Banca Mediterranea, a defunct bank in southern Italy, a successor of Banca Popolare di Pescopagano e Brindisi
- Banca della Campania, a defunct subsidiary of Banca Popolare dell'Emilia Romagna
- Banca Popolare del Mezzogiorno, a defunct subsidiary of Banca Popolare dell'Emilia Romagna
- Banca Cattolica di Molfetta, an Italian bank based in Molfetta, Apulia, a defunct subsidiary of Banca Antonveneta
