= Banca Tercas =

- Native name: Banca Tercas
- Formerly: Cassa di Risparmio della Provincia di Teramo; Tercas S.p.A.
- Type: Division (former subsidiary)
- Industry: Financial services
- Predecessor: Casse di Risparmio di Atri; Casse di Risparmio di Nereto
- Founded: 12 October 1939; 24 June 1992 (spin off)
- Defunct: 2016 (as company)
- Fate: merged into parent company as a division
Successor
Fondazione Tercas	(charity function only, since 1992)
Division of Banca Popolare di Bari	(banking activities)
- Headquarters: 36 Corso San Giorgio, Teramo, Italy
- Area served: Abruzzo; Molise (Campomarino & Termoli); Marche; Emilia (Bologna & Modena); Romagna (Forlì & Cesena); Lazio (Rome & Tivoli)
- Net income: (2014)
- Total assets: €2,869 million (2014)
- Total equity: €154 million (2014)
- Owner: Banca Popolare di Bari
- Parent: Banca Popolare di Bari (100%)
- Subsidiaries: Banca Caripe (99.979%)
- Capital ratio: 7.025% (Tier 1)
- Website: www.tercas.it
- Footnotes; Data in separate balance sheet

Banca Tercas, formerly known as Cassa di Risparmio della Provincia di Teramo was an Italian savings bank based in Teramo, Abruzzo. On 1 January 2011 the bank purchased fellow savings bank Banca Caripe from Banco Popolare. The enlarged banking group was also referred as Tercas Caripe. However, Tercas was acquired by Banca Popolare di Bari (BP Bari) in 2014, which in turn Tercas and Caripe became part of the BP Bari Group as divisions. A spin off organization of the bank, Fondazione Cassa di Risparmio della Provincia di Teramo or Fondazione Tercas, still operates as a charity organization and independent from Banca Popolare di Bari.

== History ==
Cassa di Risparmio della Provincia di Teramo was found on 12 October 1939 (date of royal decree) by the merger of Casse di Risparmio di Atri and Casse di Risparmio di Nereto. On 24 June 1992, the bank was split into Tercas S.p.A. and a banking foundation. The banking foundation owned 80% shares of the società per azioni (company limited by shares), while one of the leading savings bank Cassa di Risparmio delle Provincie Lombarde (Cariplo) owned the rest of shares or 20%. Cariplo also owned 20% shares of fellow Abruzzo-based savings banks Carichieti and Caripe.

In October 2006 Banca Tercas S.p.A. was founded. The banking foundation sold 15% shares they owned to the public. Banca Intesa, the successor of Cariplo, retained their 20% shares. In 2007 Intesa Sanpaolo, the successor of Banca Intesa, sold their 20% shares on Banca Tercas for €89 million to other investors. Creval was a minority shareholders of the bank for 7.8%.

On 1 January 2011 Banca Tercas acquired the controlling interests of Banca Caripe (95%) for €228 million from Banco Popolare. Fondazione Pescara Abruzzo, the banking foundation which originated from Caripe, owned 3.5% shares of Banca Tercas as well as 5% of Banca Caripe.

=== Special administration ===
From 2012 to 30 September 2014, Banca Tercas was under special administration. As at 31 December 2011, the bank had a shareholder's equity of €339.098 million (in consolidated balance sheet), as well as Tier 1 capital ratio of just 5.82% (in Basel II basis). During the special administration, Fondo Interbancario di Tutela dei Depositi (FITD) contributed €265 million to the bank as capital.

=== acquired by Banca Popolare di Bari ===
In November 2013 Banca Tercas was acquired by Banca Popolare di Bari (BP Bari). BP Bari subscribed the entire capital increase of Banca Tercas for €230 million. After the capital increase, Banca Tercas had a CET1 capital ratio of 8.052%, in separate balance sheet at 30 September 2014 (Basel III basis). However, the ratio was fell back to just 7.025% as at 31 December 2014. (which the Bank of Italy required a minimum 4.5% that must maintained all the time, plus 2.5% buffer that should be restore as soon as possible)

In December 2015 European Commission ruled that the bail-out of Banca Tercas by FITD was a state aid, requesting the bank to return the aid to the deposit guarantee fund. FITD then set up a voluntary intervention mechanism to allow the member banks of FITD voluntary to inject capital again to Tercas for €271,868,990.25 and other banks.

At the same time, Banca Tercas S.p.A. was absorbed into BP Bari. Banca Tercas ceased to be a separate legal entity and became a division.

== Banking foundation ==
Fondazione Cassa di Risparmio della Provincia di Teramo or Fondazione Tercas is the original legal person of the bank, which became the parent entity of the new legal person of the bank, a società per azioni, from 1992 until the bail-out. The foundation currently a charity organization for the Abruzzo region.

== Sponsorship ==
The bank was a sponsor of Teramo Basket.

== See also ==
- Cassa di Risparmio della Provincia dell'Aquila, another Abruzzo based savings bank (now defunct)
- List of banks in Italy
