= Banca Popolare del Lazio =

Italian cooperative bank in Velletri

Coordinates: 41°40′53.7″N 12°46′41.6″E

People's Bank of Lazio
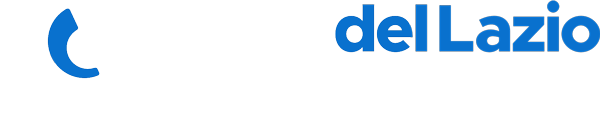
- Native name: Banca Popolare del Lazio
- Company type: Cooperative society with shares (S.C.p.A.)
- Founded: 1904 (Pio X); 1994 (BP Lazio)
- Headquarters: 9 via Martiri delle Fosse Ardeatine, Velletri, Italy
- Area served: Lazio region
- Net income: ▲€10 million (2014)
- Total assets: ▲€2.165 billion (2014)
- Total equity: ▲€288 million (2014)
- Capital ratio: 17.66% (Tier 1, Dec.2014)
- Website: www.bplazio.it
- Footnotes / references in separate balance sheet

Banca Popolare del Lazio S.C.p.A. (BP Lazio), is an Italian cooperative bank based in Velletri in the Lazio region.

== History ==
The bank was founded in 1994 by the merger of Banca Popolare Pio X (founded 1904) and Banca Popolare di Terracina (founded 1954).

== See also ==
- Banca Popolare del Frusinate, a Lazio-based bank
- Banca Popolare dell'Alto Lazio, a defunct bank
