= Credito Emiliano =

Italian bank

- Native name: Credito Emiliano S.p.A.
- Formerly: Banca Agricola Commerciale di Reggio Emilia
- Type: Public (Società per Azioni)
- Traded as: BIT: CE; FTSE Italia Mid Cap component
- ISIN: IT0003121677
- Industry: financial sector
- Founded: 1910
- Headquarters: 4 via Emilia San Pietro, Reggio Emilia, Italy
- Key people: Lucio Igino Zanon di Valgiurata (Chairman); Stefano Morellini (General Manager)
- Services: Retail banking, corporate banking, private banking
- Revenue: ▼€1.883 billion (2025)
- Operating income: ▼€838.1 million (2025)
- Net income: ▲€621.5 million (2025)
- Total assets: ▼€67.9685 billion (2024)
- Total equity: ▲€4.2925 billion (2024)
- Owner: Credito Emiliano Holding (79.82%); others (20.18%)
- Number of employees: 6,818 (2026)
- Parent: Credito Emiliano Holding
- Capital ratio: 16.99% (CET1, group, 2025)
- Website: credem.it
- Footnotes; Revenue is net interest and fee income (margine di intermediazione). Figures on a consolidated basis.

Credito Emiliano S.p.A. (Credem) is an Italian bank based in Reggio Emilia, Emilia-Romagna. It was founded in 1910. Its shares have been listed on Borsa Italiana since October 1997 and it is a component of the FTSE Italia Mid Cap index.

The group offers retail, corporate and private banking. As of 30 September 2026 it had 596 branches, business centres, small-business centres, private banking centres and financial shops across 19 Italian regions.

Credem was designated a Significant Institution under the criteria of European Banking Supervision in 2015 and is therefore directly supervised by the European Central Bank.

Credem has received media attention because it holds wheels of Parmigiano Reggiano cheese as collateral for loans.

== History ==
Founded in 1910 as Banca Agricola Commerciale di Reggio Emilia, the bank acquired Banca Belinzaghi of Milan in 1982 and took the name Credito Emiliano (abbreviated Credem) in 1983. In 1993 the Credito Emiliano group was formed, headed by Credito Emiliano Holding, and in 1997 the bank was listed on the stock exchange. Between 1991 and 2003 it absorbed a number of banks, among them Istituto Bancario Siciliano and Banca di Girgenti in 1991, Banca Creditwest e dei Comuni Vesuviani in 1995 and Banca della Provincia di Napoli in 1998.

In 1999, the bank was ranked 8th in terms of branches on the island of Sicily.

In October 2020 Credem agreed to acquire Cassa di Risparmio di Cento, which was merged into Credem in 2021.

General Manager Angelo Campani died suddenly on 4 July 2025; on 9 July the board appointed Stefano Morellini, previously co-general manager, as his successor.

In 2025 Credem reported a net profit of €621.5 million (+0.2%), including a €98.6 million gain from the sale of its merchant acquiring business. Net profit for the first nine months of 2026 was €458.8 million, 12.5% higher than the 2025 figure excluding that gain.

In October 2026, Credem announced that it entered exclusive talks with Banca del Mezzogiorno – MedioCredito Centrale in order to acquire BdM Banca.

== Coverage and media ==
=== Inclusion in research ===
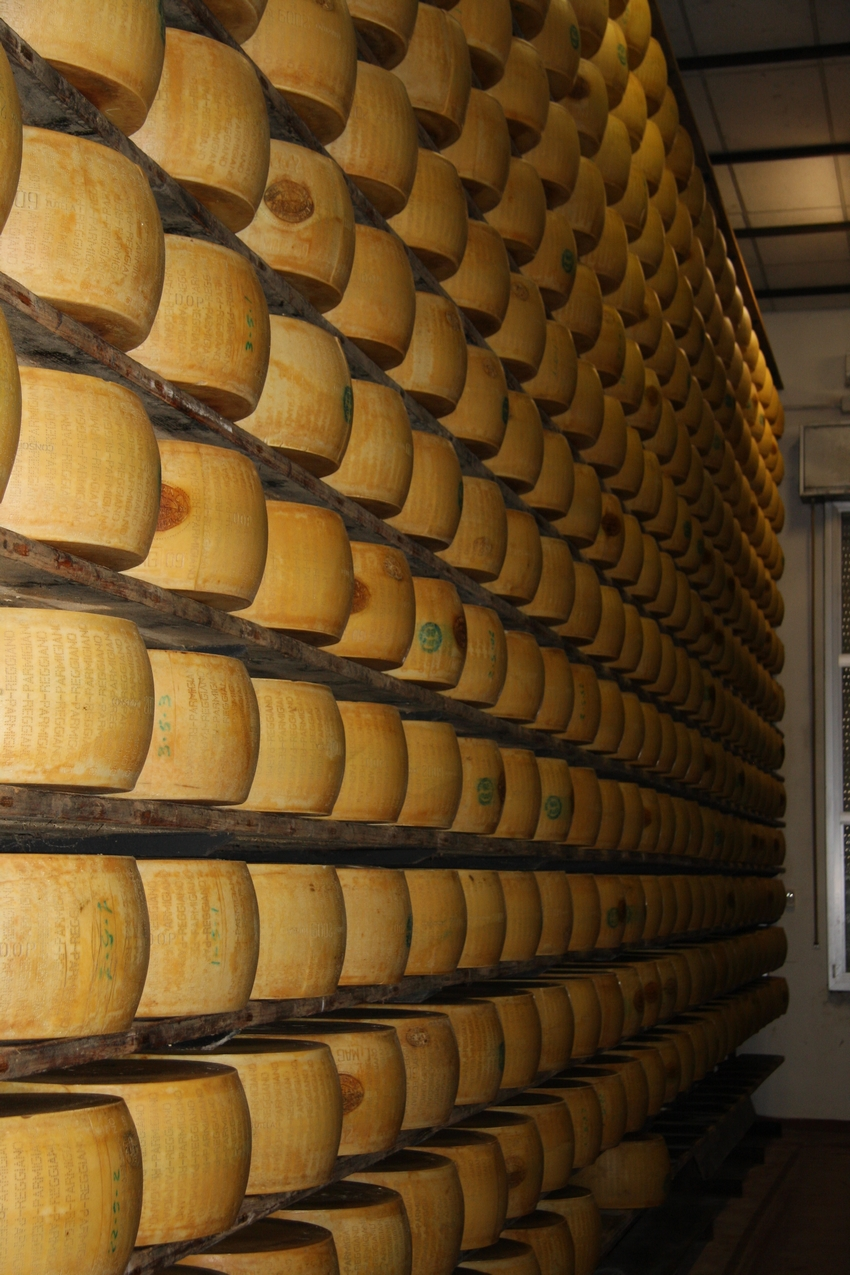
Wheels of Parmigiano Reggiano cheese used as collateral by Credito Emiliano

According to research by Mediobanca, Credito Emiliano was ranked the 11th largest bank in Italy by total assets as of 31 December 2015. If central banks, postal savings and subsidiaries of foreign banking groups are included, it ranked 10th (9th among retail and commercial banking groups if investment banks and insurance-bank conglomerates such as Banca Mediolanum and Mediobanca are left out).

=== Cheese as collateral ===
Credito Emiliano has received attention from organizations such as Harvard Business School, the USDA Foreign Agricultural Service, and the New York Times, because it holds wheels of Parmigiano Reggiano cheese as collateral for debt. The bank has accepted cheese as collateral since 1953. As of 2015, a subsidiary of the bank operated climate-controlled warehouses that could store 440 thousand wheels of cheese weighing 80 pounds (36 kg) each, and also leased out warehouse space for non-collateral cheese.

== Shareholders ==
Credito Emiliano Holding was formed in 1993 as the holding company of the group and owns 79.82% of the bank; the remainder is traded on Borsa Italiana. Part of Credito Emiliano Holding's shares are bound by a lock-up agreement; at 31 December 2023 its largest signatories were Cofimar S.r.l. (24.58% of the holding company's capital) and Società anonima finanziaria emiliana S.r.l. (8.62%).

== Acquisitions ==
Between 1994 and 1998, the group acquired the following

- Banca Popolare Vittorio Emanuele di Paternò
- Banca Euromobiliare
- BCC Corleone
- Banca Creditwest e dei Comuni Vesuviani
- Banca Tamborino Sangiovanni
- Banca Popolare San Marco Argentano
- BCC Ciminna, BCC Bonifati
- BCC Curinga
- Banca dei Comuni Nolani
- 3 branches of Deutsche Bank in Catania
- BCC San Giovanni Gemini
- Banca della Provincia di Napoli

From 1999 to 2008 the group acquired the following

- Banca Popolare Dauna
- BCC Fortore-Miscano
- BCC San Fili, BCC Jonica
- BCC Alto Crotonese
- Banca Popolare Andriese
- Banca dei Laghi
- Banca di Latina
- Euromobiliare Corporate Finance
- Credimmobili
- Anteprima

== Subsidiaries and joint ventures ==
The group's companies include:

Banking and finance

- Credem Euromobiliare Private Banking
- Avvera
- Credemleasing
- Credemfactor
- Credemtel

Asset management and advisory

- Euromobiliare Asset Management SGR
- Euromobiliare Advisory SIM
- Euromobiliare Fiduciaria

Insurance companies

- Credemvita
- Credemassicurazioni (50-50 joint venture with Reale Mutua Assicurazioni)

== See also ==
- Parmigiano Reggiano
- List of banks in the euro area
- List of banks in Italy
