= Banca Caripe =

Italian saving bank

- Formerly: Cassa di Risparmio e di Credito Agrario di Loreto Aprutino; Cassa di Risparmio della Provincia di Pescara; Cassa di Risparmio di Pescara e Loreto Aprutino; Banca Caripe S.p.A.
- Company type: Brand (former s.p.a. and subsidiary)
- Industry: Financial services
- Founded: 1871 in Loreto Aprutino; 1992 in Pescara (S.p.a. and foundation split); 14 July 2016; 9 years ago (as brand)
- Successor: Fondazione Pescara Abruzzo (charity function only); branch of Banca Popolare di Bari (banking activities)
- Headquarters: Pescara, Italy
- Area served: Abruzzo and Marche
- Owner: Banca Popolare di Bari
- Parent: Banca Popolare di Bari
- Website: caripe.com

Banca Caripe S.p.A. was an Italian saving bank based in Pescara, Abruzzo Region. There were 13 branches of the bank outside the Province of Pescara in Abruzzo and Marche regions, out of 48 total. In 2016 the bank was absorbed by the parent company Banca Popolare di Bari, but retaining as brand.

== History ==
Cassa di Risparmio e di Credito Agrario di Loreto Aprutino was found in Loreto Aprutino, Kingdom of Italy in 1871. In 1936 the bank was renamed into Cassa di Risparmio della Provincia di Pescara, con sede in Loreto Aprutino (later shorten to Cassa di Risparmio di Pescara e Loreto Aprutino).

In 1992, due to Legge Amato, the bank was split into Cassa di Risparmio di Pescara e Loreto Aprutino S.p.A. (Società per Azioni; company limited by shares) as well as Fondazione Cassa di Risparmio di Pescara e di Loreto Aprutino (the banking foundation; later known as Fondazione Pescara Abruzzo). Cassa di Risparmio delle Provincie Lombarde (Cariplo) immediately acquired 20% shares of the limited company, as well as fellow saving banks of Abruzzo Region: Cassa di Risparmio della Provincia di Chieti and Cassa di Risparmio della Provincia di Teramo.

In 2000, Banca Intesa sold 20% shares back to the banking foundation.

=== As a subsidiary of Banca Popolare di Lodi ===
On 16 February 2001, the bank was renamed to Banca Caripe S.p.A.. In the same year Banca Popolare di Lodi (Bipielle Group, BPL), through direct and indirect ownership: Istituto di Credito delle Casse di Risparmio Italiane (ICCRI), bought 30% shares of the bank. In 2003 the group was increased to own 51% shares through Reti Bancarie. In 2006 Reti Bancarie was absorbed into BPL. BPL owned 51% shares directly as well as the foundation had a put option to sell the remaining 44% shares to BPL (the foundation retained 5% shares), which the foundation eventually sold the stake to BPL. Banca Caripe became part of Banco Popolare banking group in 2007.

=== As a subsidiary of Banca Tercas ===
On 1 January 2011 the controlling interests in the bank were sold to Banca Tercas for €228 million from Banco Popolare. The banking foundation retained 5% shares. On 31 December 2011, Banca Caripe had a shareholders' equity of €113 million, and a Tier 1 capital ratio of 8.93% (in Basel II basis). However, from 2012 to 30 September 2014, the parent company Banca Tercas was under special administration due to insolvency. The CET1 capital ratio of Banca Carpie once fell to 0.18% at 31 December 2013, with a shareholders' equity of just €1 million. Banca Caripe was also under special administration on 3 July 2014.

=== As a subsidiary of Banca Popolare di Bari ===
In 2014, Banca Tercas banking group was acquired by Banca Popolare di Bari. Banca Caripe was also recapitalized for €75 million during the year. As at 30 September 2014, the CET1 capital ratio was 7.59% (in Basel III basis), and shareholders' equity was €65 million. The ratio was decreased to 7.004% at 31 December 2014.

Banca Popolare di Bari absorbed Banca Caripe in 2016.

== Banking foundation ==
After the fold of the S.p.A., the original legal entity of the bank (and later the original parent entity of the S.p.A.)., still operates as Fondazione Pescara Abruzzo. As at 31 December 2016, the foundation had a stakeholders' equity of €204 million; it was the minority shareholders of Cassa Depositi e Prestiti (0.019%), CDP Reti (0.047%), Banca Popolare di Bari (0.000517%), Banca Popolare Province Molisane (0.58%), Serfina Banca (9.95%), Banca Popolare Etica (0.0088%), Poste italiane (50,000 shares) and other companies.

== See also ==
- List of banks in Italy
