= Credito Fondiario (Fonspa) =

Credito Fondiario S.p.A.
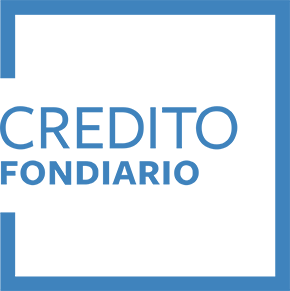
- Native name: Credito Fondiario S.p.A.
- Company type: private Società per Azioni
- Industry: Financial services
- Founded: 1898; 128 years ago
- Headquarters: Rome, Italy
- Key people: Piero Gnudi (was Chairman)
- Services: Non-performing loans
- Website: Official website

Credito Fondiario is an Italian bank based in Rome, Italy. The bank is specializing in management of non-performing loans. Chairman of the board of directors was Piero Gnudi.

== History ==
The bank was found in 1898 as Credito Fondiario Sardo (Sardinian Land Credit). In 1965 the bank became Credito Fondiario S.p.A., which was owned by Banco di Roma, Banca Commerciale Italiana and Credito Italiano.

In 1992 Credito Fondiario e Industriale – Fonspa – Istituto per i Finanziamenti a Medio e Lungo Termine S.p.A., which specialized in housing mortgage at that time, was allowed to enter the market of crediting industrial companies, following the criteria in decree N°902/1976.

The bank was owned by UniCredit and Banca Commerciale Italiana for 24.92% each in 1999. In 2000 Fonspa was sold to Morgan Stanley Real Estate Funds. In 2006 Morgan Stanley acquired the bank from the fund via subsidiaries. The bank was renamed to Fonspa Bank.

It was sold to Tages Holding in 2013, and returned to use the name Credito Fondiario. As of 2016, the bank was owned by Tages Holding (46%), Tiber Investments (28%), own staffs and other shareholders (26%).

The bank acquired €302 million gross book value of bad debts from Banca Popolare dell'Etruria e del Lazio in 2015. The bank was also planned to take over another bank which was also under special administration by the state at that time: Banca delle Marche in 2014. However, Banca delle Marche was bailed out by Italian National Resolution Fund instead on 22 November 2015. Credito Fondiario, as a creditor to Banca delle Marche for €1.8 billion, also sold the collateral in order to recover the loan in May 2015. The takeover plan was called off due to the European Commission's investigation regarding possible state aid (which was not allowed) by Credito Fondiario's partner in the plan: Fondo Interbancario di Tutela dei Depositi.
