= BdM Banca =

BdM Banca (ex Banca Popolare di Bari)
- Native name: Banca Popolare di Bari S.C.p.A.
- Type: cooperative
- ISIN: IT0000220514
- Industry: Financial services
- Founded: 1960
- Founder: Luigi Jacobini
- Headquarters: 19 Corso Cavour, Bari, Italy
- Number of locations: ▼362 branches (2016)
- Area served: 13 regions of Italy (mainly in Apulia, Basilicata, Abruzzo & Umbria)
Key people
| Marco Jacobini | (chairman) |
| Giorgio Papa | (CEO) |
- Brands: Banca Caripe; Banca Tercas
- Services: Retail and corporate banking
- Net income: ▼€-170 million (2016)
- Total assets: ▼€10.801 billion (2021)
- Total equity: ▼€1.069 billion (2016)
- Number of employees: ▼2,329 (2021)
- Subsidiaries: CariOrvieto (73.57%)
- Capital ratio: ▼9.92%% (CET1)
- Website: (in Italian)

Banca Popolare di Bari S.C.p.A. (BP Bari), now BdM Banca, is an Italian bank based in Bari, Apulia region. The bank covered most of mainland Italy (13 of 18 regions), except Piedmont and Liguria, and all the autonomous regions of Italy: Aosta Valley, Trentino – South Tyrol, Friuli – Venezia Giulia and the islands of Sardinia and Sicily.

As of 31 December 2016, BP Bari Group had 362 branches (101 branches in Abruzzo), with BP Bari itself having 308 branches in 11 regions. Subsidiary Cassa di Risparmio di Orvieto had 54 branches in 2015. the bank was bailed out by the Italian state in 2019 and acquired by Banca del Mezzogiorno - MedioCredito Centrale in 2020. In 2023, the bank was renamed BdM Banca.

== History ==
Banca Popolare di Bari was founded in 1960 as a cooperative bank. The bank absorbed Banca Popolare della Penisola Sorrentina (based in Sorrento Peninsula), Banca Popolare di Calabria (based in Calabria) in the early 2000s. In 2001 it acquired Nuova Banca Mediterranea, a major bank in Basilicata (with branches from Campania and Apulia also). In 2004 Banca Mediterranea was also absorbed into BP Bari. In 2014, BP Bari contributed the capital increases of Banca Tercas, which was under special administration by the state. After the transactions Banca Tercas and its subsidiary Banca Caripe, the major saving banks in Abruzzo, became subsidiaries of BP Bari. In 2016 BP Bari partnered with Aviva in bancassurance for 5-year.

With the state guarantee (Garanzia sulla Cartolarizzazione delle Sofferenze) to senior tranche of the bad debt (Italian: sofferenze), BP Bari securitizated €800 million gross book value of non-performing loan. (in tranches of senior and junior loans) The bank also announced to absorb the two subsidiaries Tercas and Caripe, which only retained as brands. On 1 June 2015, BP Bari received the assets and liabilities of Banca Popolare delle Province Calabre, which was in liquidation.

In December 2019, the Italian government bailed out Banca Popolare di bari for €900 million. In June 2020, Banco Popolare di Bari's shareholders approved a plan to restructure the bank by turning it into a joint stock company as well as injecting 933 million euros in new capital. This new capital was provided by state-owned Banca del Mezzogiorno - MedioCredito Centrale and Fondo Interbancario di Tutela dei Depositi (FITD), the Italian public depositor protection fund. In concrete terms, Mediocredito Centrale - Banca del Mezzogiorno acquired and took control of Banca Popolare di bari. In July 2023, Banca Popolare di bari was renamed as BdM Banca (the acronym BdM stands for Banca del Mezzogiorno).

== Shareholders ==
As a popular bank, there was a cap on individual's stake in the bank. However, some notable institution also owned a minority share, such as Fondazione Banco di Napoli, the former owner (and banking foundation) of Banco di Napoli, as well as Fondazione Pescara Abruzzo, the former owner of Banca Caripe. Nuova Cassa di Risparmio di Ferrara (Nuova Carife) also owned 0.56151% shares, which was a relic of a cross-ownership between BP Bari and old Carife.

== See also ==
- Banca Popolare di Puglia e Basilicata, an Italian bank based in Altamura, Apulia
- Banca Popolare Pugliese, an Italian bank based in Parabita, in the Province of Lecce, Apulia
- Banca Apulia, an Italian bank based in San Severo, in the Province of Foggia, Apulia, a subsidiary of Veneto Banca
- Banco di Napoli, an Italian bank serving southern Italy, a subsidiary of Intesa Sanpaolo
