= Banca Popolare di Puglia e Basilicata =

Italian cooperative bank

- Native name: Banca Popolare di Puglia e Basilicata S.C.p.A.
- Formerly: Banca Popolare della Murgia
- Company type: Società Cooperativa per Azioni
- Industry: Financial services
- Predecessor: Banca Agraria di Gravina; Banca Popolare di Altamura
- Founded: 1883; 143 years ago (BA Gravina); 1888; 138 years ago (BP Altamura); 1972; 54 years ago (BP Murgia); 1995; 31 years ago (BP Puglia e Basilicata)
- Headquarters: 13 Via O. Serena, Altamura, Italy
- Number of locations: 137 branches (2014)
- Area served: 12 regions of Italy; mainly in Apulia
- Services: Retail banking
- Net income: ▲ (€2,490,450) (2014)
- Total assets: ▼€4,312,275,995 (2014)
- Total equity: ▲€317,376,347 (2014)
- Capital ratio: 10.82% (CET1)
- Website: Official website (in Italian)
- Footnotes / references source

Banca Popolare di Puglia e Basilicata S.C.p.A. is an Italian cooperative bank based in Altamura, in the province of Bari, Apulia region.

The bank had 137 branches, covering 12 out of 20 regions of Italy. However, they were located mainly in Southern Italy: 75 in Apulia (covered all 6 provinces), 14 in Campania, 10 in Basilicata, 4 in Abruzzo and 3 in Molise (0 in Calabria and the two islands); in central Italy 9 in Lazio, 4 in Marche and 2 in Emilia-Romagna (Ravenna and Rimini; 0 in Tuscany and Umbria regions); in northern Italy, 1 in Friuli – Venezia Giulia (in Pordenone), 4 in Veneto, 9 in Lombardy and 2 in Piedmont (in Biella and Vercelli).

== History ==
Banca Popolare di Puglia e Basilicata was formed by several mergers of cooperative banks from southern Italy.

=== Banca Popolare della Murgia ===
Banca Popolare della Murgia was formed in 1972 by the merger of Banca Cooperativa Agraria di Gravina (found 1883) and Banca Mutua Popolare Cooperativa di Altamura (found 1888). In 1994 the bank absorbed Cassa Rurale e Artigiana dell'Icona di Tursi, a bank from nearby Basilicata region.

=== Banca Popolare di Puglia e Basilicata ===
In 1995 Banca Popolare della Murgia absorbed Banca Popolare di Taranto (found 1889) to form Banca Popolare di Puglia e Basilicata. In the same year the bank also acquired Banca Popolare della Provincia di Foggia. From 1996 to 2001 the bank also absorbed Banca di Credito Cooperativo dell'Alto Bradano di Banzi, Banca di Credito Cooperativo Vulture Vitalba di Atella and some business units of Banca di Credito Cooperativo degli Ulivi – Terra di Bari and Banca di Credito Cooperativo di Corleto Perticara. In 2002 the bank acquired 10 branches of Capitalia from Apulia, Campania and Molise regions.

== See also ==
- Banca Popolare di Bari, an Italian bank based in Bari, Apulia
- Banca Popolare Pugliese, an Italian bank based in Parabita, in the province of Lecce, Apulia
- Banca Apulia, an Italian bank based in San Severo, in the province of Foggia, Apulia, a subsidiary of Veneto Banca
- Banco di Napoli, an Italian bank serving south Italy, a subsidiary of Intesa Sanpaolo
- Banca Carime, an Italian bank serving south Italy, a subsidiary of UBI Banca
- Banca di Credito Cooperativo dell'Alta Murgia, an Italian bank

- Banca di Roma, a defunct subsidiary of UniCredit
- Banca Mediterranea, a defunct bank in southern Italy, a successor of Banca Popolare di Pescopagano e Brindisi
- Banca della Campania, a defunct subsidiary of Banca Popolare dell'Emilia Romagna
- Banca Popolare del Mezzogiorno, a defunct subsidiary of Banca Popolare dell'Emilia Romagna
- Banca Cattolica di Molfetta, an Italian bank based in Molfetta, Apulia, a defunct subsidiary of Banca Antonveneta
