= Federico Ghizzoni =

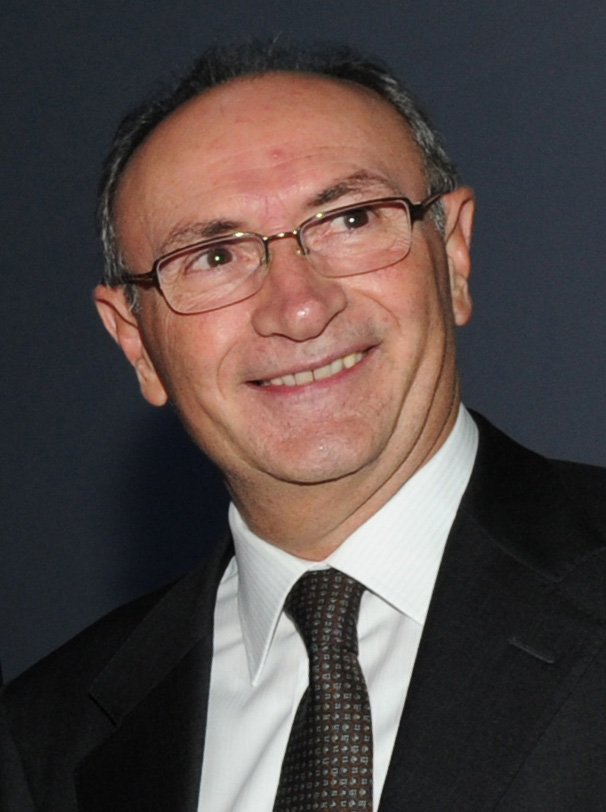
- Ghizzoni in 2012
- Born: 14 October 1955 (age 70); Piacenza, Italy
- Years active: 3

Federico Ghizzoni was the CEO of Italian bank UniCredit, as well as the COO of Koç Financial Services. He has been CEO at UniCredit since September 2010 till 24 May 2016 and has a distinguished career at the company, spanning more than 30 years.

== Career ==
Ghizzoni's has spent his entire career at UniCredit, with his first role as customer relations manager at a branch in his town of origin, Piacenza. He went on to hold numerous senior management positions at some of the bank's international operations, with posts in southeast Asia and western Europe. During the nineties, Ghizzoni was the deputy general manager of UniCredit's London office and later went on to head the firm's Singaporean operations.

In 2000, Ghizzoni was appointed as head of UniCredit's division in Poland, Bank Pekao, while three years later, he was put in charge of the firm's joint venture that controlled Turkey’s largest bank, Yapi Kredi.

== Other roles ==
Ghizzoni also sits on the management board at the Bank Austria and is the chairman of the Orchestra Filarmonica della Scala Association in Milan.

He is a member of the board of directors of the Institute of International Finance in Washington, D.C., as well as the IMF, the Institut International d'Edtudes Bancaires in Brussels, and of the European Services Financial Round Table.

== Education ==
Ghizzoni holds a degree in law from the University of Parma’s law school, from where he graduated in 1980.
