= Banca Carime =

- Company type: subsidiary of a listed company
- Industry: Financial services
- Predecessor: Carical; Caripuglia; Carisal
- Founded: 1861 (Carical); 1949 (Caripuglia); 1956 (Carisal); 1998 (Banca Carime)
- Defunct: 20 February 2017
- Headquarters: [snc] Viale Crati, Cosenza, Italy (legal); 18 Viale Francesco De Blasio, Bari, Italy (main back office)
- Number of locations: 216 (2015)
- Products: Retail banking
- Net income: ▲ (€20,849,283) (2015)
- Total assets: ▼€7,154,337,171 (2015)
- Total equity: ▼€1,054,675,528 (2015)
- Owner: UBI Banca (99.9886%); others (0.0114%)
- Number of employees: ▼1808 (2015 average)
- Parent: UBI Banca
- Capital ratio: 41.24% (CET1)
- Footnotes / references source

Banca Carime S.p.A. was an Italian bank based in Cosenza, Calabria. The bank was a subsidiary of UBI Banca. As of 31 December 2015, the bank had 216 branches (all located in Southern Italy), serving Calabria (84 branches), Apulia (93 branches), Campania (where Salerno is located; 20 branches) and Basilicata (19 branches).

In 1999, the bank had 341 branches: 146 in Calabria, 45 in Basilicata, 122 in Apulia, 27 in Campania and 1 in Molise.

== History ==
The bank was formed by the union of the saving banks (Italian: Cassa di Risparmio) of Calabria–Basilicata (Carical, found 1861).), Apulia (Caripuglia, found 1949), and Salerno (Carisal, found 1956) by Cariplo. In 1996, Cariplo held 80% shares of Carisal and 63.71% shares of Caripuglia directly, as well as around 60% shares of Carical through direct ownership and through Fincarime, Caripuglia and Carisal. In 1997, Fincarime was renamed to Banca Carime S.p.A. with Cariplo SpA owned 98.70% shares directly and indirectly, as well as Cariplo reached 100% ownership for Carisal, 96.05% for Caripuglia and Carical 99.88%. The three local banks were started to merged into one subsidiary Banca Carime on 1 January 1998.

Right after Cariplo merged with Banco Ambrosiano Veneto to form Banca Intesa on 2 January 1998, Caripuglia ceased to exist that year, followed by Carisal and Carical in 1999.

In January 2001, 19 branches of the bank were sold to Banca Nuova of Banca Popolare di Vicenza banking group.

However, on 29 June 2001, Banca Intesa sold 75% stake of Banca Carime to Banca Popolare Commercio e Industria for €1.191 billion, with Intesa retained 24.92% only. In 2002 Intesa sold the minority interests to Deutsche Bank, with warrants issued by the German bank to BPCI to buy Carime at the same price, which the contract would last until 2006. On 1 July 2003 Carime followed BPCI to become a member of Banche Popolari Unite (BPU). BPU also excised the warrants in 2005.

On 1 April 2007 Carime became a member of UBI Banca due to another merger. At the same year Carime also sold 15 branches to Banca Popolare Pugliese, effective on 1 May.

== See also ==
- List of banks in Italy
