= Banca Popolare del Frusinate =

- Native name: Banca Popolare del Frusinate
- Company type: Cooperative society with shares (S.C.p.A.)
- Founded: 1992
- Headquarters: Frosinone, Italy
- Area served: the Province of Frosinone and Rome City
- Key people: Fabio Sbianchi (Presidente); Domenico Astolfi (Direttore Generale)
- Brands: meglioBanca.it
- Capital ratio
- Website: www.bpf.it

Banca Popolare del Frusinate S.C.p.A. (BPF) is an Italian cooperative bank based in Frosinone, Lazio. The bank was founded in 1992.

== Sponsorship ==
The bank is a sponsor of Frosinone Calcio.
