= Banca Tirrenica =

Banca Tirrenica Nuova Banca dell'Etruria e del Lazio
- Formerly: Banca Popolare dell'Etruria e del Lazio
- Company type: cooperative (former legal form); società per azioni (legal form); subsidiary (since 2017); state-owned (2015–2017); public coop/company (1998–2015); unlisted coop (1881–1998)
- Traded as: BIT:PEL (former)
- ISIN: IT0004919327
- Industry: Financial services
- Predecessor: Banca Popolare Aretina; Banca Popolare dell'Etruria; Banca Popolare dell'Alto Lazio
- Founded: 16 April 1881 (Popolare Aretina); 18 December 1971 (Banca Etruria); 31 December 1988 (Banca Etruria e Lazio); 22 November 2015 (Nuova Banca Etruria)
- Defunct: 27 November 2017
- Fate: became branches of UBI Banca
- Headquarters: Arezzo, Italy (de facto); Bergamo, Italy (registered office)
- Key people: Osvaldo Ranica (chairman); Silvano Manella (CEO)
- Services: Retail and corporate banking
- Net income: (€267 million) (2016)
- Total assets: ▼€6.569 billion (2016)
- Total equity: ▼€175 million (2016)
- Owner: UBI Banca (100%)
- Parent: UBI Banca
- Subsidiaries: Banca Federico del Vecchio
- Capital ratio: ▼4.4% (Group CET1, Dec.2016)
- Website: bancaetruria.it
- Footnotes / references in consolidated financial statement

Banca Tirrenica S.p.A. formerly known as Nuova Banca dell'Etruria e del Lazio S.p.A. was an Italian bank based in Arezzo, Tuscany. The bank was re-established on 22 November 2015 as a good bank of the original Banca Popolare dell'Etruria e del Lazio (BPEL). The bank was bought by UBI Banca on 18 January 2017 for a nominal fee.

Both Tyrrhenian and Etruria were alternative names for the area that is located in Central Western Italy.

== History ==
=== Banca Popolare dell'Etruria ===
Banca Mutua Popolare Aretina was founded on 16 April 1881 in Arezzo. On 18 December 1971 the bank absorbed two fellow Tuscan "Popular Banks": Banca Popolare Senese (found 1865 in Siena) and Banca Popolare della Provincia di Livorno, as well as being renamed Banca Popolare dell'Etruria.

In 1972, Banca Popolare di Montepulciano was absorbed, followed by Banca Popolare di Pontevalleceppi (a Perugia frazione) in 1982, Banca Popolare di Cagli in 1985 and Banca Popolare di Gualdo Tadino in 1987.

=== Banca Popolare dell'Etruria e del Lazio ===
On 31 December 1988 Banca Popolare dell'Alto Lazio (founded 1974) was merged into the bank, forming Banca Popolare dell'Etruria e del Lazio. In 1990 Banca Cooperativa di Capraia Montelupo e Vitolini was absorbed. In 1998 the bank was listed in Borsa Italiana (ticker symbol: PEL).

In 2006 the bank acquired a majority interest in Banca Federico Del Vecchio, reaching 100% in 2008. In 2008 Banca Popolare Lecchese joined the banking group (sold in 2015). In mid-2014 the bank was changed from a co-operative partnership (Italian: Società Cooperativa) to a company limited by shares (Italian: Società per Azioni).

=== Insolvency ===
The bank was administered by the Ministry of Economy and Finance in early 2015. The last annual report of the old bank showed the bank had a shareholders equity of €632.060 million, and Tier 1 capital ratio of just 6.6% as at 31 December 2013 (Basel II basis). The ratio fell to just 6.1% as at 30 June 2014 on a Basel III basis. (which Basel III required above 6%, as well as Banca d'Italia required above 7%)

On 17 November 2015, a gross book value of €302 million of bad debts (Italian: sofferenze) were sold to Credito Fondiario without recourse.

A capital injection of more than €2 billion to Banca Etruria, Banca Marche, Carife, and CariChieti by Fondo Interbancario di Tutela dei Depositi was planned in late 2015, (€426 million for Banca Etruria) subject to the permission of the Bank of Italy and European Central Bank.

Eventually, they were bailed out by the ItalianItalian National Resolution Fund on 22 November instead, for about €2 billion recapitalization. The rescue of the four banks was in line with the EU Bank Recovery and Resolution Directive, which was in force in Italy in late 2015. Bank of Italy was the assigned "national resolution authority" of this mechanism. As the plans were following the directive, they were approved by the European Commission. Banca Etruria assets and liabilities would split into good and bad bank, while the old bank would be liquidated, which the shareholders and subordinated bond holders would receive nothing due to bail-in.

The fund had also injected an additional €1.7 billion to the 4 banks to cover the losses.

On 3 May 2016, Decree-Law N°59/2016 was announced, which the retail investors of the bond of the 4 banks would be refunded (up to €100,000, same as deposit insurance) if they purchased the bond on or before 12 June 2014, the date of the Bank Recovery and Resolution Directive was passed in the European Parliament. The decree-law was a response to criticism of the bail-in of all investors of the bank, which Italian banks often sold risky bonds to their depositors. The refund scheme: Fondo di solidarietà, would be managed by FITD.

=== Nuova Banca Etruria / Banca Tirrenica ===
logo used circa November 2015 to 2017

On 22 November 2015 a good bank was spin off from the original bank as Nuova Banca dell'Etruria e del Lazio S.p.A.. At that time the good bank had a Tier 1 capital ratio of 9%, and a share capital of €442 million. While the bad debts were transferred to a single "bad bank" REV - Gestione Crediti, which was shared with Carichieti, Carife and Banca delle Marche.

On 18 December 2015, Nuova Banca Etruria sold 54.212% stake in Banca Popolare Lecchese to a private equity fund managed by Oaktree Capital Management, via BPL Holdco. The fund immediately recapitalised the bank, making the fund become the new majority owners of Popolare Lecchese for 84.9%. At 31 December 2015, the audited CET1 ratio of Nuova Banca dell'Etruria e del Lazio was 11.1% on a consolidated basis.

On 12 January 2017, UBI Banca made a biding bid of a nominal €1 for Nuova Banca Etruria, Nuova CariChieti and Nuova Banca Marche. UBI Banca also requested conditions that the balance sheets of the three banks would be cleaned up before the completion of the deal (which was done by selling NPLs to Atlante II and Credito Fondiario) as well as recapitalization of the 3 banks for an estimated €450 million (eventually €713 million), by the National Resolution Fund. On 18 January the bid was accepted. On 10 May, the transaction was completed, which Nuova Banca Etruria was renamed to Banca Tirrenica. On the same day, a plan to merge the 3 banks into UBI Banca was also announced.

The merger by absorption was effective on 27 November 2017.

== See also ==
- List of banks in Italy
