= Südtiroler Volksbank – Banca Popolare dell'Alto Adige =

Volksbank – Banca Popolare
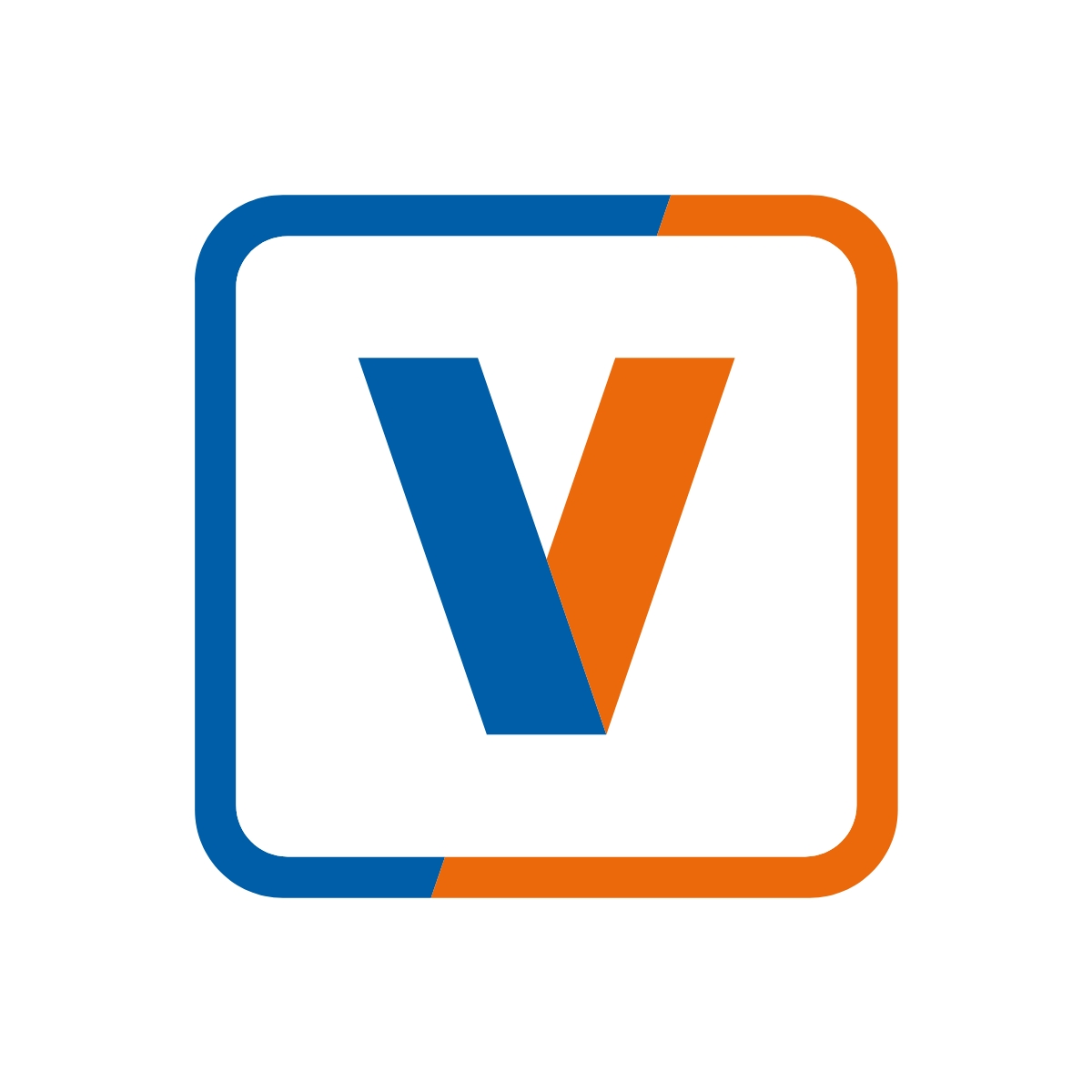
- Native name: Südtiroler Volksbank A.G.; Banca Popolare dell'Alto Adige S.p.A.
- Company type: Società per Azioni; Aktiengesellschaft
- ISIN: IT0003458640
- Industry: financial services
- Predecessor: Volksbank Bozen; Volksbank Brixen; Volksbank Meran; Banca Popolare di Marostica; Banca di Treviso
- Founded: 15 May 1992
- Headquarters: Bolzano, South Tyrol, Italy
- Number of locations: 189 branches (2025)
- Area served: North Eastern Italy; (South Tyrol, Trentino, Veneto, Friuli)
- Key people: Lukas Ladurner (chairman); Alberto Naef (GM)
- Services: Retail and corporate banking
- Net income: €8 million (2016)
- Total assets: €9.316 billion (2016)
- Total equity: €861 million (2016)
- Number of employees: 1,480 (2025)
- Capital ratio: 11.72% (CET1)
- Website: Official website (in German); Official website (in Italian)
- Footnotes / references source of data

The South Tyrolian People's Bank (German: Südtiroler Volksbank, Italian: Banca Popolare dell'Alto Adige, known as Volksbank or Banca Popolare) is an Italian bank headquartered in Bolzano. The bank originated as a cooperative bank, but demututalized in 2016.

The bank was the second-largest bank in Trentino – South Tyrol with a market share of 8.8%. After the merger with Banca Popolare di Marostica in 2015, it was expected that the bank was the seventh bank in Veneto with a market share of 3.2% (behind Intesa Sanpaolo, UniCredit, Banca MPS, Banco Popolare, BPVicenza and Veneto Banca) and more specifically 6.2% in the Province of Vicenza as the 6th. After the announcement of the proposed merger of BPVicenza and Veneto Banca in 2017, Volksbank – Banca Popolare increased in ranking in the Veneto region.

As of 31 December 2025, the bank had 189 branches in Trentino – South Tyrol, Veneto and Friuli Venezia Giulia.

== History ==
It was established in 1992 through the merger of two South Tyrolian cooperative banks, Volksbank Bozen – Banca Popolare di Bolzano from Bolzano (founded 1902 as Spar-und Vorschuß-Casse für Handel und Gewerbe) and Volksbank Brixen – Banca Popolare di Bressanone (found 1889 as Spar-und Darlehenskassenverein für die Pfarrgemeinde Brixen) from Brixen. In 1995 it acquired another South Tyrolian cooperative bank Volksbank Meran – Banca Popolare di Merano (founded 1886 as Gewerbliche Spar- und Vorschuß-Casse) headquartered in Merano. The bank's primary markets are the two autonomous provinces of South Tyrol (63 branches) and Trentino (20 branches), as of 2014. In recent years it has been aggressively expanding into the neighboring Veneto region with 102 branches in 5 provinces (by absorbing Venetian banks Banca Popolare di Marostica in 2015 and its subsidiary Banca di Treviso). The bank has also expanded its operations to the Friuli sub-region in the Province of Pordenone. In addition to the province of origin, the bank is present in much of north-eastern Italy, particularly in the provinces of Trento, Belluno, Treviso, Vicenza, Padua, Venice, Udine, Pordenone and Verona for a total (at the end of 2025) of 189 branches, over 1,300 collaborators and about 280,000 customers.
