= Fondo Interbancario di Tutela dei Depositi =

Italian deposit guarantee fund

The Fondo Interbancario di Tutela dei Depositi (FITD; English: Interbank Deposit Protection Fund) is an Italian deposit guarantee fund founded in 1987. The fund became a mandatory scheme under the EU Deposit Guarantee Schemes Directive (94/19/EEC). However, the cooperative banks (BCC) of Italy managed their own fund (Fondo di Garanzia dei Depositanti del Credito Cooperativo). Another fund guaranteed asset management firm in Italy: Fondo Nazionale di Garanzia.

== History ==
The Fondo Interbancario di Tutela dei Depositi (FITD) was founded in 1987. It was mandatory for Italian banks to join either FITD or the Fondo di Garanzia dei Depositanti del Credito Cooperativo. The latter was for the cooperative banks (banca di credito cooperativo (BCC) network, excluding the cooperative bank type banco popolare) of Italy. Some banks that were demutualized from the BCC network, such as Banca di Cambiano, switched to FITD after the demutualization.

Due to the change in the directive (2014/49/EU), which was part of the Single Rulebook, the regulatory foundations for the Banking Union, the fund transitioned from an ex-post to an ex-ante system. The fund eventually joined the single deposit guarantee scheme of the EU. However, in the immediate future, the fund was re-insured by the European Deposit Insurance Scheme.

From 1987 to 2015, 43 member banks were under special administration by the Italian government, with the Bank of Italy as the actual administrator. The fund carried out 11 interventions, 2 of which out of 11 returned to normal operation: Cassa di Risparmio di Prato and Banca Tercas. Four additional banks were bailed-out by the newly established Italian National Resolution Fund of the EU Single Resolution Mechanism in 2015: Banca delle Marche, Banca Popolare dell'Etruria e del Lazio, Cassa di Risparmio della Provincia di Chieti and Cassa di Risparmio di Ferrara. Istituto per il Credito Sportivo, GBM Banca and Banca Popolare delle Province Calabre were still under special administration as at 2015.

FITD recapitalized the banks instead of liquidating them, as repayment to the depositors of the maximum of €100,000 each was more costly. However, in December 2015, the European Commission ruled that the capital injection to Banca Tercas in 2014 would be classified as state aid. The commission requested the beneficiary return the aid to the fund. Lack of approval from the commission explained the non-involvement in the bail-out of the four banks in 2015.

In 2016 member of FITD set-up a voluntary scheme separate from the mandatory funding. Banca Tercas returned the aid to FITD, but funded the voluntary scheme for the same amount. In 2016, the voluntary scheme subscribed the €280 million recapitalization of Cassa di Risparmio di Cesena (Caricesena). In 2017, Caricesena, along with Banca Carim and Cassa di Risparmio di San Miniato, were sold to Crédit Agricole Cariparma (trading as Crédit Agricole Italia) for €130 million. Before the formal handover, the FITD voluntary scheme recapitalized the banks for €470m.

In November 2018, the voluntary scheme made another bail-out. The scheme was the underwriter for €320 million of €400 million Banca Carige's Tier 2 subordinated bonds.

== Interventions ==
List of interventions:

- Cassa di Risparmio di Prato
- Banco di Tricesimo
- Banca di Girgenti
- Banca di Credito di Trieste
- Credito Commerciale Tirreno
- Sicilcassa
- Banca Valle d'Itria e Magna Grecia
- Banco Emiliano Romagnolo
- Banca MB
- Banca Network Investimenti
- Banca Tercas

=== Voluntary scheme ===
- Banca Tercas
- Cassa di Risparmio di Cesena
- Cassa di Risparmio di San Miniato
- Banca Carim
- Banca Carige

== Chairmen ==
- Paolo Savona (2010–2014)
- Salvatore Maccarone (2014–)

== Members ==
- "Member banks". Fondo Interbancario di Tutela dei Depositi. 15 March 2016.
