= Banco di Napoli =

Former Italian banking subsidiary

- Formerly: Sanpaolo Banco di Napoli
- Company type: Subsidiary
- Industry: Financial services
- Predecessor: Banco dell'Annunziata; Banco della Pietà; Banco Nazionale di Napoli; Banco delle Due Sicilie; Banco di Napoli; Banco di Napoli S.p.A.
- Founded: 1463 (first mentioned bank); 1539 (mount of piety); 1794 (merger of 8 Naples banks); 2003 (current legal entity)
- Defunct: 2018
- Fate: absorbed into Intesa Sanpaolo
- Headquarters: 177 via Toledo, Naples, Italy
- Products: Retail banking
- Owner: Intesa Sanpaolo (100%)
- Parent: Intesa Sanpaolo
- Website: www.bancodinapoli.it

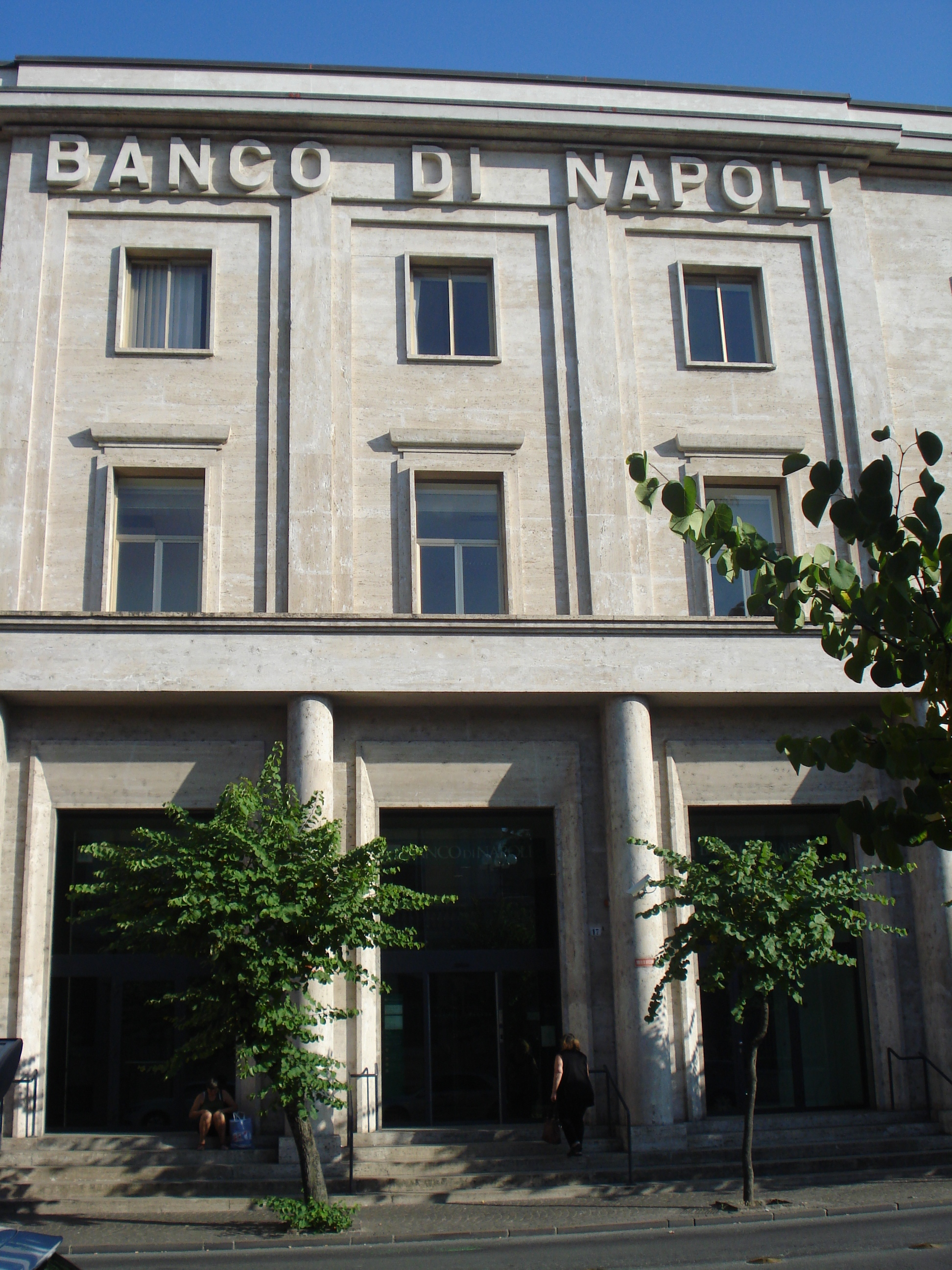

Banco di Napoli S.p.A., among the oldest banks in the world, was an Italian banking subsidiary of Intesa Sanpaolo group, as one of the 6 retail brands other than "Intesa Sanpaolo". It was acquired by the Italian banking group Sanpaolo IMI (the predecessor of Intesa Sanpaolo) in 2002 and ceased being an independent bank. In February 2018, Intesa Sanpaolo announced their new business plan, which would retire Banco di Napoli and other brands; the legal person of Banco di Napoli would be absorbed into Intesa Sanpaolo S.p.A.

== History ==
The Banco of Naples is one of the most important and oldest historic banks, as its origins date back to the so-called public benches of charitable institutions, which arose in Naples between the sixteenth and seventeenth centuries, especially at a mount of piety founded in 1539 on a pledge to lend without interest, which in 1584 opened a case of deposits, recognised by a proclamation of the viceroy of Naples in the same year. According to some scholars its origin may be dated back to 1463, when Casa Santa dell'Annunziata was founded in Naples. It was started by Saint Cajetan, an Italian Catholic Saint, mainly to help protect the poor and needy from usurers, who would demand high interest in return. This would make the Bank of Naples the oldest bank in continuous operation till 2018, world-wide.

Seven other similar institutions were later founded in Naples between 1587 and 1640:

- "Banco dei Poveri" (1563)
- "Banco della Santissima Annunziata" (1587)
- "Banco del Popolo" (1589)
- "Banco dello Spirito Santo" (1590)
- "Banco di Sant'Eligio" (1592)
- "Banco di San Giacomo e Vittoria" (1597)
- "Banco del Salvatore" (1640).

After nearly two centuries of activities independently of each other, a decree of Ferdinand IV of Bourbon, in 1794, leading to the unification of the eight existing institutes into a single structure that is called Banco Nazionale di Napoli.

Following the political changes that took place in the nineteenth century in Naples and Southern Italy, also the Bank of Naples changes name and structure. Passing from the realm of the Bourbons to the matrix Napoleon, the king of Naples, Joachim Murat attempts to transform the Bank into a limited company similar to the Bank of France and create the Bank of the Two Sicilies (Italian: Banco delle Due Sicilie), bound to have the same functions through the Cassa di Corte and Cassa dei Privati. With the revolutionary upheavals of 1849 loses agencies Sicilian who founded the Banco di Sicilia. New changes take place in 1861 with the unification of Italy, the changes that mark the birth of the name Banco di Napoli, the bank will be responsible for the issuance of the currency of the Kingdom of Italy for 65 years.

In 1991, due to Legge Amato, a società per azioni was incorporated as a subsidiary of the original bank to run banking activities, while the original entity, as a statutory corporation became a holding entity instead, later known as Fondazione Banco di Napoli.

However, the S.p.A. was nationalized due to insolvency.

In 1997 the bank was re-privatized, with the formation of a bad bank Società per la Gestione di Attività (SGA), as well as wind-down the subsidiary ISVEIMER; 60% stake of the bank was acquired by Istituto Nazionale delle Assicurazioni (INA) and Banca Nazionale del Lavoro (BNL) via an intermediate holding company (INASSIT, later Banco di Napoli Holding).

INA and BNL later sold the holding company to Sanpaolo IMI.

Following the acquisition of the bank at the end of 2002 by the Sanpaolo IMI group, in 2003 the bank changed its name to "Sanpaolo Banco di Napoli". The operation was carried out in two distinct phases:

- At the end of 2002 [old] Banco di Napoli S.p.A. was absorbed by the parent company Sanpaolo IMI.
- A new subsidiary was incorporated as Sanpaolo Banco di Napoli S.p.A. in April 2003, which with effect from 1 July 2003 took over the whole business of the old Banco di Napoli.

With the merger in December 2006 of Banca Intesa and Sanpaolo IMI, the former bank has now become part of the group Intesa Sanpaolo as Banco di Napoli S.p.A..

On November 26, 2018 the Bank of Napoli was officially closed and integrated into the "Intesa Sanpaolo".

== Corporate structure ==
The integration of Banco di Napoli into the group Sanpaolo IMI in 2000 led to its geographical operating area being reduced: all branches in northern and central Europe, which would have overlapped with the existing structure of the parent company, were closed or moved. However, at the same time the southern branches of Sanpaolo IMI were transferred into the newly renamed Sanpaolo Banco di Napoli.

In the Italian regions of Abruzzo, Molise, and Lazio, which were areas where the Banco di Napoli was historically less strong because before the Italian unification they had not been part of the Kingdom of the Two Sicilies, here at first after the take-over the branches of the bank were incorporated into the Sanpaolo; but later in Abruzzo and Molise it was decided to incorporate them into the Banca dell'Adriatico.

Until 2018, therefore, the Banco di Napoli operated only in Campania, Apulia, Basilicata, and Calabria, with the exception of one branch at the Palazzo Montecitorio in Rome. The bank's network included some 687 branches, and had approximately 5,750 employees.

== See also ==
- List of oldest companies
- List of central banks
- List of banks in Italy
