= Fondazione Carisbo =

Italian philanthropic organization

- Formation: 21 December 1991
- Headquarters: Palazzo Saraceni; 15 via Farini; Bologna, Italy
- Subsidiaries: Museo della Città di Bologna S.r.l.
- Website: Official website

Fondazione Cassa di Risparmio in Bologna (Fondazione Carisbo) is a philanthropic organization formed in 1991 by the separating of the bank into a private limited company and a banking foundation. The headquarter of the foundation was right opposite to Palazzo di Residenza della Cassa di Risparmio in Bologna, the headquarter of the bank.

The foundation was the main founder of Casse Emiliano Romagnole Bank Group, which merged with Cardine Banca in 2000. In 2002 the group merged with Sanpaolo IMI. As at 31 December 2006, the foundation was the third largest shareholders of Sanpaolo IMI for 5.54%.

As at 31 December 2014 the foundation hold 1.979% shares of Intesa Sanpaolo. As at 31 December 2014 the foundation had a shareholders equity of €755,008,584.

The foundation was one of the founder of Bologna Business School. The foundation also operates arts gallery in San Giorgio in Poggiale, Bologna, as well as a museum in Palazzo Pepoli Vecchio, Bologna.
