= Cassa di Risparmio del Friuli Venezia Giulia =

Italian savings bank

- Formerly: Friulcassa S.p.A. Cassa di Risparmio Regionale
- Company type: subsidiary
- Industry: Financial services
- Predecessor: Cassa di Risparmio di Udine e Pordenone; Cassa di Risparmio di Gorizia; Monte di Credito su Pegno di Udine
- Founded: 1 December 2003
- Defunct: 2018
- Fate: absorbed by Intesa Sanpaolo
Headquarters
Gorizia, Italy	(registered office)
Udine, Italy	(de facto)
Number of locations
▼92 branches and business centers	(end 2016)
▼88 branches and business centers	(end 2017)
- Area served: Friuli – Venezia Giulia region
Key people
Giuseppe Morandini	(chairman, until April 2017)
Paolo Baessato	(chairman, since May 2017)
Stefano Baro	(general manager and managing director)
- Services: Retail banking; corporate banking
Net income
▲€11 million	(2016)
▼€5 million	(2017)
Total assets
▲€3.970 billion	(2016)
▲€4.872 billion	(2017)
Total equity
▲€265 million	(2016)
▲€284 million	(2017)
- Owner: Intesa Sanpaolo (100%)
Number of employees
▼883	(end 2016)
▼874	(end 2017)
- Parent: Intesa Sanpaolo
Capital ratio
▲15.0%	(CET1, end 2016)
▼14.7%	(CET1, end 2017)
Rating
No rating	(Moody's, December 2017)
Baa1/P-2	(parent company rating, Moody's, December 2017)
- Website: www.carifvg.it
- Footnotes / references sources

Cassa di Risparmio del Friuli Venezia Giulia S.p.A., known as CariFVG in short, was an Italian savings bank based in Gorizia, Friuli – Venezia Giulia region.

== Predecessors ==
=== Cassa di Risparmio di Gorizia ===
Cassa di Risparmio di Gorizia was found on 1831 in Gorizia and Gradisca, in the Austrian Empire by the Count Giuseppe/Joseph (della Torre) von Thurn Hofer und Valsassina. Due to Legge Amato, the bank formed a subsidiary Cassa di Risparmio di Gorizia S.p.A. (a company limited by shares; Italian: società per azioni), with the original corporation became a private entity Fondazione Cassa di Risparmio di Gorizia. (Decree of the Ministry of the Treasury on 26 June 1992; gazetted on 22 July 1992)

=== Cassa di Risparmio di Udine e Pordenone ===
A predecessor of Cassa di Risparmio di Udine e Pordenone was formed in 1496 as a mount of piety (Italian: monte di pietà), by a Franciscan Domenico da Ponzone, in the Republic of Venice, 34 years after the first recorded mount of Italy was founded in Perugia, by other Franciscans, Bernardine of Feltre and Michele Carcano, in the Papal States.

The first savings bank (Italian: cassa di risparmio) of the city was formed in 1822 but soon ceased business.

In 1876 Cassa di Risparmio di Udine was re-established as an autonomous entity on the basis of a branch of Cassa di Risparmio delle Provincie Lombarde.

In 1928, due to the royal decree-law No.269 of 1927, (law no.2587 of 1927) which promoted merger of banks if they did not pass a threshold of size, the savings bank acquired the mounts of piety located in San Daniele del Friuli and Cividale del Friuli.

During World War II, in 1942, the mount, as that time known as its new name Monte di Credito su Pegno di Udine, was merged to the savings bank.

It was renamed to Cassa di Risparmio di Udine e Pordenone in 1968 (same year as the foundation of the Province of Pordenone, which was split from the province of Udine).

By a decree of the Ministry of the Treasury, Cassa di Risparmio di Udine e Pordenone S.p.A. was formed in 1991 and the original statutory corporation became Fondazione Cassa di Risparmio di Udine e Pordenone (now Fondazione Friuli). The limited company immediately recapitalized, which Cassa di Risparmio di Verona, Vicenza, Belluno e Ancona owned 25% stake of the share capital after increase.

=== As subsidiaries of Casse Venete Banca ===
The two foundations of the savings banks, along with banking foundations from Venice and Padova–Rovigo, formed a common holding company Casse Venete Banca. The holding merged with Casse Emiliano Romagnole in 2000 to form Cardine Banca and in 2002 the group merged with Sanpaolo IMI. During the period the two savings banks remained as two separate subsidiaries.

== History ==
On 1 December 2003 Friulcassa S.p.A. Cassa di Risparmio Regionale was formed by the merger of the two savings banks. The bank later renamed as Cassa di Risparmio del Friuli Venezia Giulia S.p.A. in 2007. In the same year the parent company Sanpaolo IMI also merged with Banca Intesa. The merger also triggered the group sold another subsidiary FriulAdria to Crédit Agricole due to Crédit Agricole withdrew as the shareholders of Intesa, as well as to avoid monopoly market share in the region. However, the group was still not allowed to open new branches in the province of Udine and Gorizia for two years.

On 22 December 2017, after Intesa Sanpaolo acquired Banca Popolare di Vicenza and Veneto Banca, the banking group announced that Cassa di Risparmio del Friuli Venezia Giulia would be absorbed into Intesa Sanpaolo as branches.

== See also ==
- Cassa di Risparmio di Trieste, fellow Friuli – Venezia Giulia savings bank
- Banca Popolare Udinese
- Banca Popolare di Pordenone
- List of banks in Italy
