= Cassa di Risparmio di Venezia =

CR Venezia
- Native name: Cassa di Risparmio di Venezia
- Company type: Subsidiary of listed company
- Industry: Bank
- Founded: 1822
- Defunct: 2014
- Headquarters: Venice, Italy
- Owners: Intesa Sanpaolo

Cassa di Risparmio di Venezia S.p.A. known as Carive or CR Venezia in short, is a former Italian savings bank, based in Venice, Veneto. It was a subsidiary of Intesa Sanpaolo. The former owner of the bank, Fondazione di Venezia, still acts as a charity organization.

== History ==
Reform in the banking sector in Venice was found by Napoleonic Italy as Banco Pignoratizio Comunale in 1806, using mount of piety model. In 1820, the Kingdom of Lombardy–Venetia (part of Austrian Empire) government introduce savings bank (Italian: Cassa di Risparmio) system to the city, which the opening of Cassa di Risparmio di Venezia was gazetted on 13 February 1822, despite the bank already opened on 12 February, the birthday of Francis II, Holy Roman Emperor (the ruler of Austrian Empire). in the 20th centenary, Carive opened branches in Mestre (1910), Portogruaro (1911), Chioggia (1912) and Dolo (1913), the cities and towns in the modern Province of Venice. In 1987, Carive had 59 branches in the Province. Since 1988, more branches were opened in the rest of Veneto region, as well as in Friuli.

Also due to Legge Amato, the daily banking operation, charity and ownership of the bank were separated as società per azioni and a banking foundation Fondazione Cassa di Risparmio di Venezia in 1992. In 1994, the bank merged with the savings bank of Padova and Rovigo, Gorizia, Udine & Pordenone and Banca Agricola di Cerea to form a single holding company Casse Venete Banca, despite the subsidiaries still operated as separate entity.

In 2000, Carive followed the parent company to merge with Casse Emiliano Romagnole Group to form Cardine Banca Group. In 2002, Carive followed the group to merge with Sanpaolo IMI. On 2 January 2007, Carive became part of Intesa Sanpaolo Group after another merger.

In 2014 the bank was absorbed into the parent company, as the parent company planned to reduce the brand of the group. All former branches of Carive now bear the name of Intesa Sanpaolo directly.

The last full year result of the bank were: revenue of €183 million, net profits of €50 million, total asset of €4.432 billion and equity of €415 million.

== Banking foundation ==
The former owner of the bank, Fondazione Cassa di Risparmio di Venezia or Fondazione di Venezia still held 0.33215% shares of Intesa Sanpaolo, or 0.35197% ordinary shares, as of 31 December 2013.

== See also ==
- Banca Popolare di Venezia
- Cassa di Risparmio del Veneto, fellow Intesa Sanpaolo subsidiary
- Cassa di Risparmio del Friuli Venezia Giulia, fellow Intesa Sanpaolo subsidiary
- List of banks in Italy
