= Cassa di Risparmio di Carpi =

Cassa Risparmio Carpi
- Native name: Cassa Risparmio Carpi S.p.A.
- Formerly: Cassa di Risparmio di Carpi
- Company type: subsidiary
- Founded: 1843
- Defunct: 2005
- Fate: absorbed by parent company
- Successor: Fondazione Cassa di Risparmio di Carpi (as charity); UniCredit (as bank)
- Headquarters: Carpi, Italy
- Owner: UniCredit
- Parent: UniCredit

Cassa di Risparmio di Carpi was an Italian retail bank based in Carpi, in the Province of Modena, Emilia-Romagna. The bank section was absorbed into UniCredit in 2005, while its charity section, still operates as Fondazione Cassa di Risparmio di Carpi.

== History ==
Cassa di Risparmio di Carpi was found in 1843 in Carpi in the Duchy of Modena and Reggio, in the Austrian Empire. On 24 January 1992 the bank was split into Cassa Risparmio Carpi S.p.A. and Fondazione Cassa di Risparmio di Carpi. The foundation also sold a minority interests to Casse Emiliano Romagnole (2 million number of shares with 10,000 lire par value, 20% of total share capital as of 1993), which in turn the banking foundation became a minority shareholders of 1,868,750 shares with 10,000 lire par value (€5.16) in the holding company. In 2000 Rolo Banca acquired a majority interests in the bank (37% from the foundation, 17.32% from Cardine Banca, 19.49% after the public offer), with the remain 26.1% shares was sold from the foundation to UniCredit in 2003 for €98 million.

In 2005 the bank was absorbed into the parent company.

== Banking foundation ==
As of 31 December 2015, Fondazione Cassa di Risparmio di Carpi had a net assets of €285 million. He was the minority owner of Cassa Depositi e Prestiti (0.0964%), CDP Reti (0.0941%), UniCredit (0.0285%), the Bank of Italy (0.2000%) and Banca Popolare Etica.

== See also ==
- Cassa di Risparmio di Modena
- Cassa di Risparmio di Vignola
- List of banks in Italy
