= Giuseppe Mengoni =

Italian architect

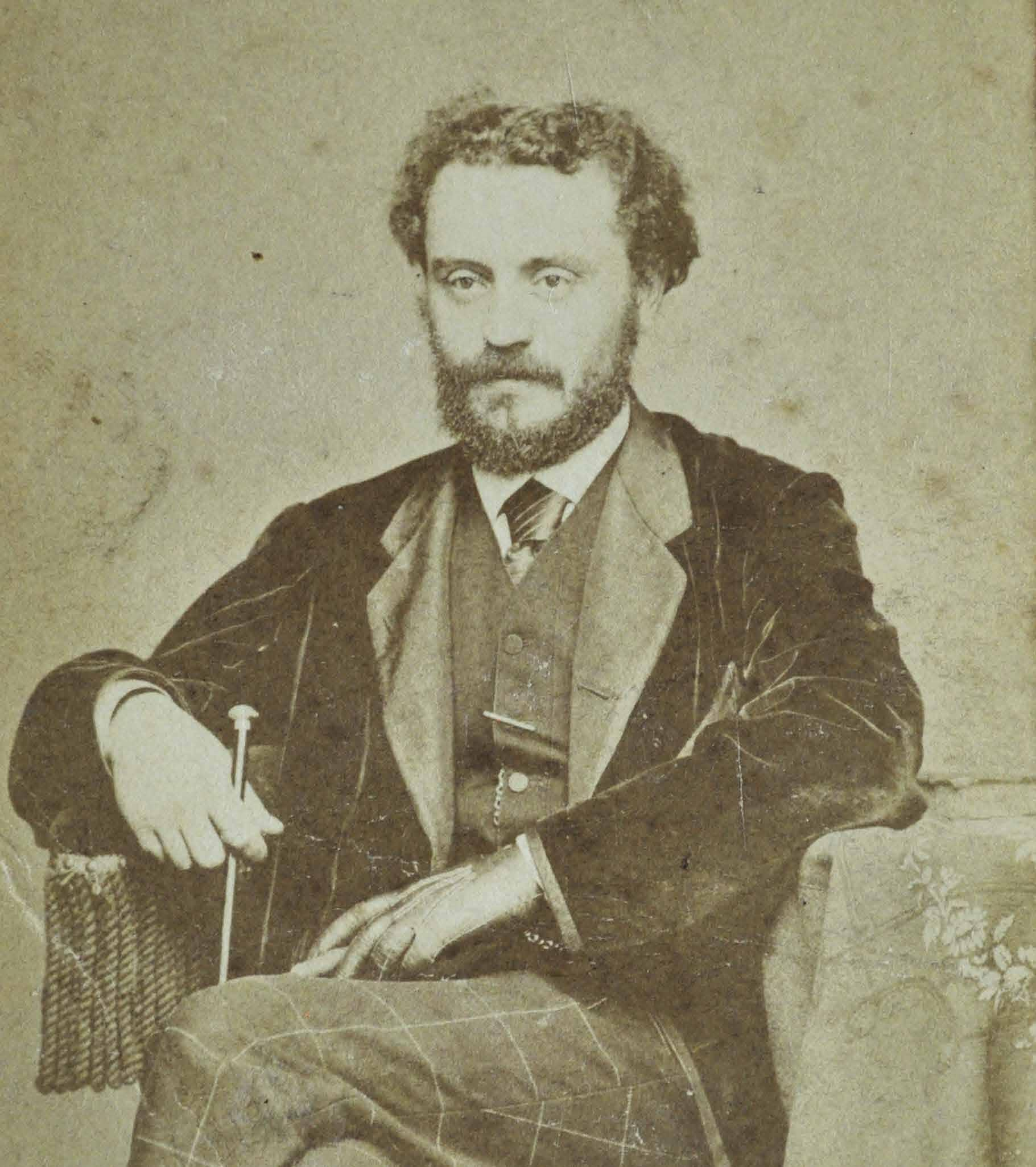
- Born: 23 November 1829; Fontanelice, Papal States
- Died: 30 December 1877 (aged 48); Milan, Kingdom of Italy
- Education: University of Bologna
- Occupation: Architect
- Spouse: Carlotta Bossi (m. 1872)
- Buildings: Galleria Vittorio Emanuele II; Palazzo di Residenza

Giuseppe Mengoni (23 November 1829 – 30 December 1877) was an Italian architect. He designed the Galleria Vittorio Emanuele II in Milan, one of the largest and most impressive iron-and-glass covered arcades of the 19th century. The project was the first example of a monumentally scaled iron and steel arcade in Italy, and was executed in a Renaissance Revival style that has become synonymous with the modern identity of post-unification Italy. Mengoni also designed the Palazzo di Residenza of Bologna Saving Bank (Carisbo).

== Biography ==
=== Early life and education ===
Giuseppe Mengoni was born in Fontanelice on 23 novembre 1829. He graduated in engineering from the University of Bologna, in 1854. While there, he also studied pictorial perspective at the Accademia di Belle Arti under Francesco Cocchi. After working for two years for the railway industry, during which time he also built a theatre (1861) at Magione (Umbria), Mengoni moved to Milan. The city was then enjoying a period of lively and dynamic renewal in the wake of its freedom in 1859 from Austrian domination. The new city council had on its agenda, among other things, the reorganization of the city centre, in particular the streets around Piazza del Duomo, following plans that had been conceived as early as the Napoleonic period.

=== In Milan ===
In 1861 Mengoni presented a project in the competition for the Piazza del Duomo, which envisaged a new street linking the Piazza and the Teatro alla Scala. This won the jury’s approval, and he was invited to participate in a second limited competition (1863) between Mengoni, Giuseppe Pestagalli (1813–73) from Milan and the Florentine Niccolò Matas.

Amid fierce controversy, Mengoni was declared the winner, above all because of his plan for the link between the cathedral and La Scala and despite the fact that his project was bitterly criticized in Milanese professional circles for the excessive pomp and grandeur it imparted to the Piazza. His plan envisaged a covered walkway for commercial use (like a wide bazaar), initially articulated along a single axis and later refined to form four avenues converging on a central octagon topped by a dome of iron and glass. The actual construction, which involved major demolition of the existing fine medieval fabric, was undertaken by an English firm (the City of Milan Improvement Co. Ltd) under contract to the city council.

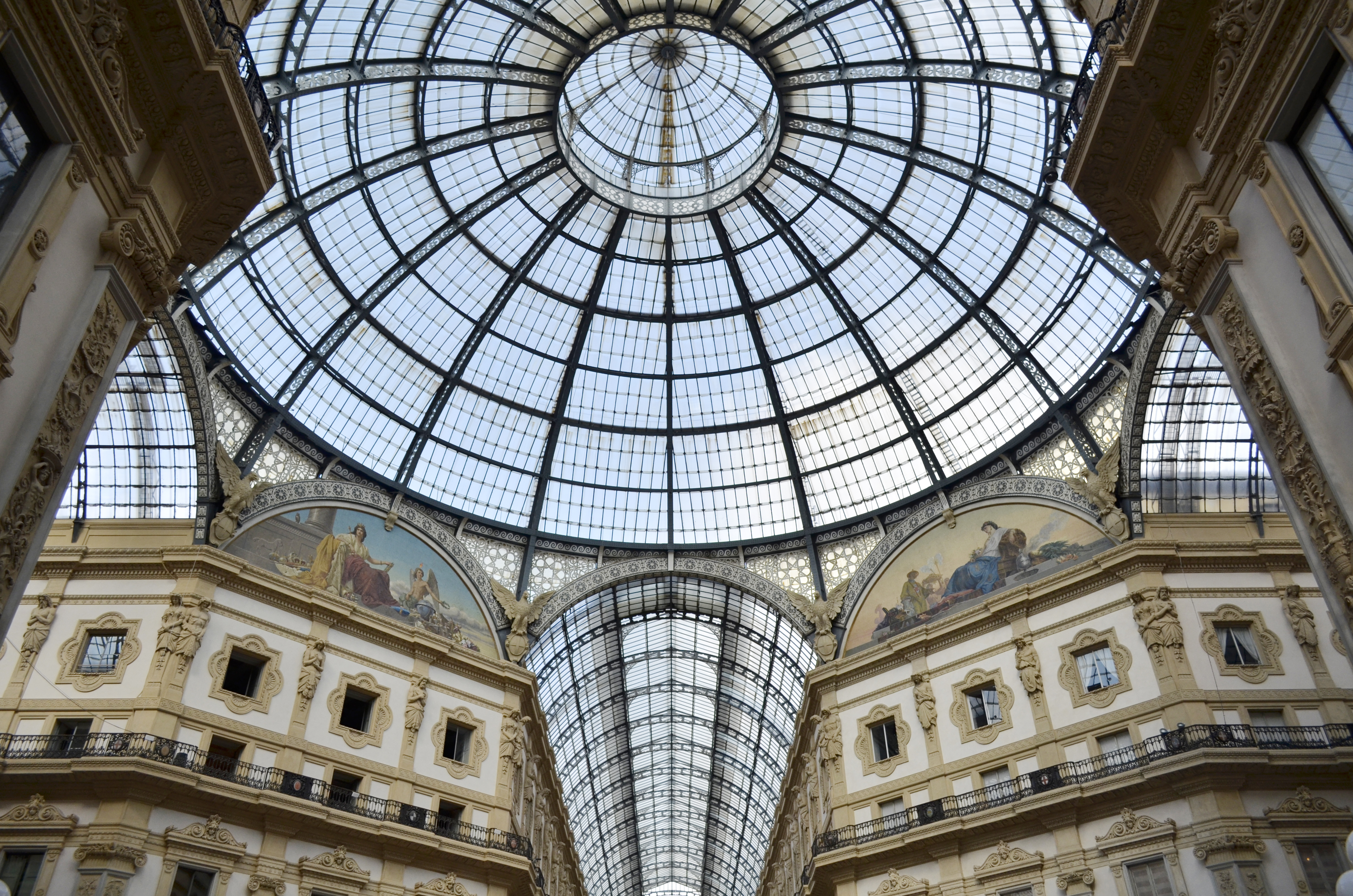
The dome of Galleria Vittorio Emanuele

Within just two years, the new Galleria was officially opened, except for the entrance arch from the Piazza del Duomo. It was an immediate success with the public, who were attracted by the rich decorative scheme that articulated the building, emphasized by the play of light produced by the iron and glass roof. The latter, built with prefabricated sections made by the Paris firm of Henry Joret, was something of a technological coup for Milan, which, while it had another covered arcade (the Galleria De Cristoforis of 1831 by Andrea Pizzala, inspired by the Parisian arcades), had never had iron and glass brought to such technical and expressive perfection.

The later stages of the Galleria were drawn out for another ten years, during which time the English construction company went bankrupt and the city council itself took over the work.

=== Later work ===
Meanwhile, Mengoni also executed three iron-and-glass covered markets (1870–75) in Florence (at San Lorenzo, la Mattonaia and Porta San Frediano) and continued his work in the Piazza del Duomo, adopting a Renaissance Revival style for the arcaded palaces flanking the cathedral. In the same style, he built the Palazzo di Residenza of Bologna Saving Bank (Carisbo) (1868–76; interior modernized) and directed architectural and urban planning schemes (1873–7) in Rome, Rimini and Cesena. During the 1870s he continued to work on the entrance arch to the Galleria from the Piazza del Duomo, which was in fact the least successful part of the entire scheme, due to its pronounced mixture of styles and its excessive and much criticized monumentality. This work marked the culmination, not just of the Galleria, but also of the architect’s life, since he died from a fall from some scaffolding a few days before the Galleria’s official opening.

== Bibliography ==
- Willard, Ashton Rollins (1898). History of Modern Italian Art. New York-Bombay. pp. 539–546, 549, 568.
- Joseph, Dagobert (1907). Geschichte der Architektur Italiens. Leipzig. pp. 442–449.
- Wolner, E.W. (1993). "Galleria Vittorio Emanuele II". In R.J. van Vynckt (ed.). International Dictionary of architects and architecture. Vol. II. Detroit-London. pp. 584–586.
- Piersensini, Edoardo (2009). "MENGONI, Giuseppe". Dizionario Biografico degli Italiani (in Italian). Vol. 73: Meda–Messadaglia. Rome: Istituto dell'Enciclopedia Italiana. ISBN 978-88-12-00032-6.
- McLaren, Brian L. (2009). "Mengoni, Giuseppe". The Oxford Companion to Architecture. Oxford: Oxford University Press.
