= Beccadelli =

Beccadelli is a surname. Notable people with the surname include:

- Antonio Beccadelli (disambiguation), multiple people
- Maria Beccadelli di Bologna
