= Banca IMI =

Italian banking company

- Company type: Società per azioni
- Industry: Financial services
- Founded: October 2007
- Founder: Intesa Sanpaolo
- Headquarters: Milan, Italy
- Products: Investment banking
- Owner: Intesa Sanpaolo (100%)
- Parent: Intesa Sanpaolo
- Website: www.bancaimi.com

Banca IMI is a division (formerly a subsidiary) of Intesa Sanpaolo which is specialised in corporate banking, investment banking and capital markets. The bank can trace its origins to the Istituto Mobiliare Italiano. IMI merged with Istituto Bancario San Paolo di Torino to form Sanpaolo IMI in 1998 (through which a new subsidiary of the new group Banca d'Intermediazione Mobiliare was created), which in turn merged with Banca Intesa in January 2007. In October Banca IMI (as Banca d'Intermediazione Mobiliare IMI S.p.A.) absorbed the corresponding subsidiary of Intesa: Banca Caboto to become the new Banca IMI S.p.A..

In July 2020, Banca IMI was merged into Intesa Sanpaolo via incorporation, becoming Intesa Sanpaolo's corporate banking and investment banking division.

== See also ==
- List of banks in Italy
