= Fondazione Cariparo =

Italian banking foundation

Fondazione Cassa di Risparmio di Padova e Rovigo (in short Cariparo) is an italian philanthropic organization formed in 1991. It was formed by separating the Cassa di Risparmio di Padova e Rovigo into two separate entities: a limited company that offers banking services and a banking foundation which holds a stake in the bank capital.

Cassa di Risparmio di Padova e Rovigo later united with other banks in the Veneto region to form Casse Venete Banca Group. In 2000 it merged with Casse Emiliano Romagnole to form Cardine Banca, which in 2002 incorporated into Sanpaolo IMI. As of December 31, 2006, Fondazione Cariparo was the second largest shareholder of Sanpaolo IMI for 7.02% shares. In 2007 Sanpaolo IMI merged with Banca Intesa to form Intesa Sanpaolo, the italian international banking group. As of December 31, 2007 the foundation was the fourth largest shareholder of Intesa Sanpaolo for 4.60% shares. As of December 31, 2020, the foundation's stake in Intesa Sanpaolo had dropped to 1.72% of shares.

The foundation has diversified investments. It had total assets of €0.841 billion as of December 31, 2001, that grew to €2.889 billion as of December 31, 2022.

The foundation had funded the restoration of Po River Delta.
