= Neos Finance =

Italian bank

Neos Finance was an Italian bank specialized in consumer credit. Before its closure, it was part of Intesa Sanpaolo Group.

== History ==
Neos Finance started as Finemiro SpA (Fin-Emi-Ro). In 1997 the parent company, Cassa di Risparmio in Bologna of Bank Group Casse Emiliano Romagnole, transformed the company into Finemiro Banca. The bank became part of Cardine Banca Group in 2000 and again part of Sanpaolo IMI in 2002. At the year of 2004, Sanpaolo IMI held 96.84% shares, Cassa di Risparmio della Repubblica di San Marino held 2.65% and Unibanca held 0.51%. In 2005 the bank changed its name to Neos Banca as well as Sanpaolo IMI reached 99.49% ownership ratio. On 2 January 2007, the bank followed Sanpaolo to merge into Intesa Sanpaolo Group, as well as reached 100% ownership. In 2009, a reverse merger was taken, which former subsidiary Neos Finance absorbed all the assets of Neos Banca.

In the year end of 2011, Neos Finance had an equity of €53,011,842; total asset of €4,983,684,044 and a net loss of €128,758,833. In 2004, the figures were equity €126.924 million, total assets €2,190,125,152 and net profits of €11,839,145. A scandal was also exposed in 2010.

On 1 January 2014 Mediocredito Italiano, another subsidiary of Intesa Sanpaolo, absorbed the leasing segment of Neos Finance, as well as rest of the business activity were merged into Intesa Sanpaolo Personal Finance on 1 April 2013.

== See also ==
- List of banks in Italy
