= List of banks in Italy =

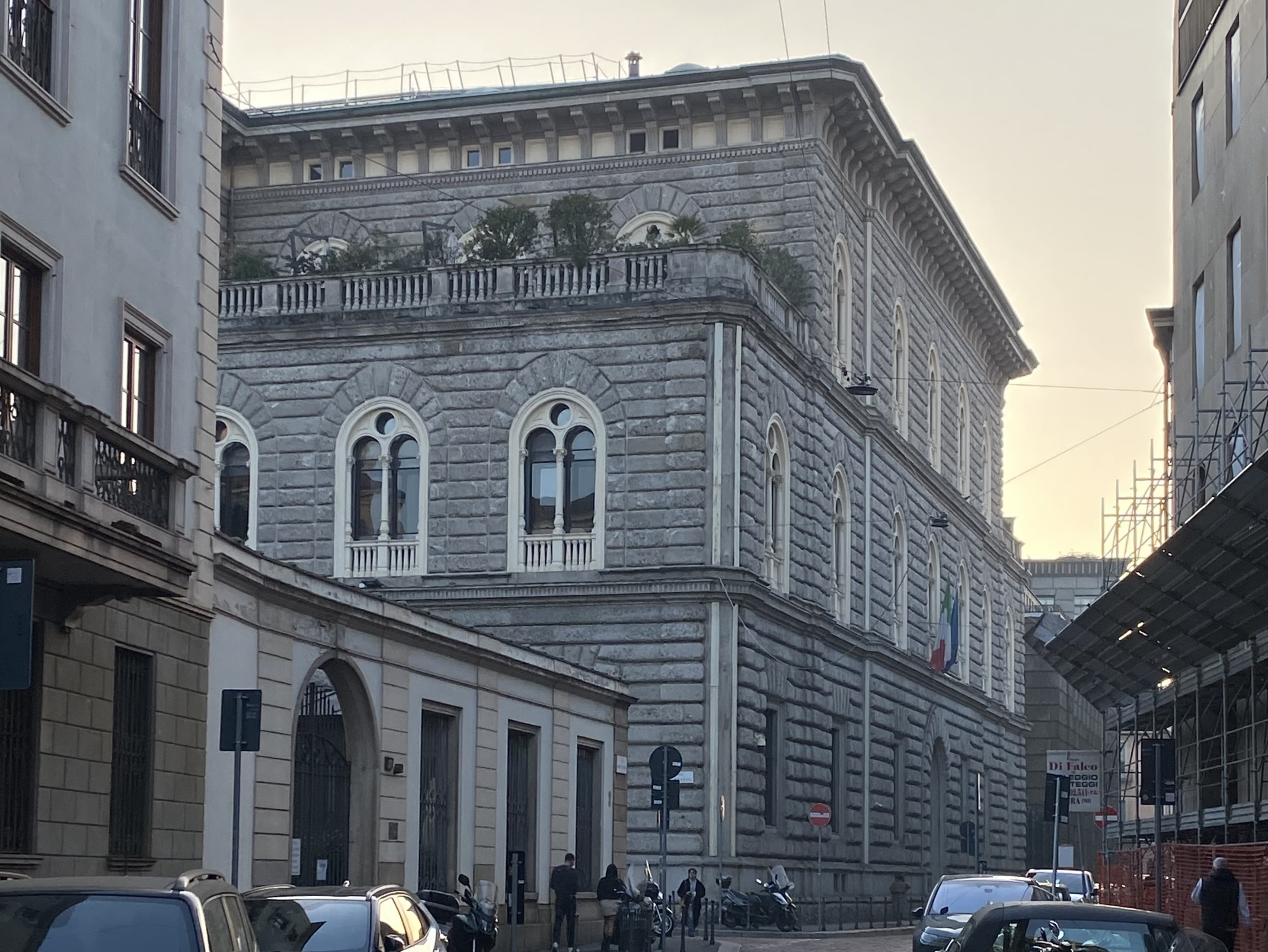
Ca' de Sass in Milan, head office of Intesa Sanpaolo

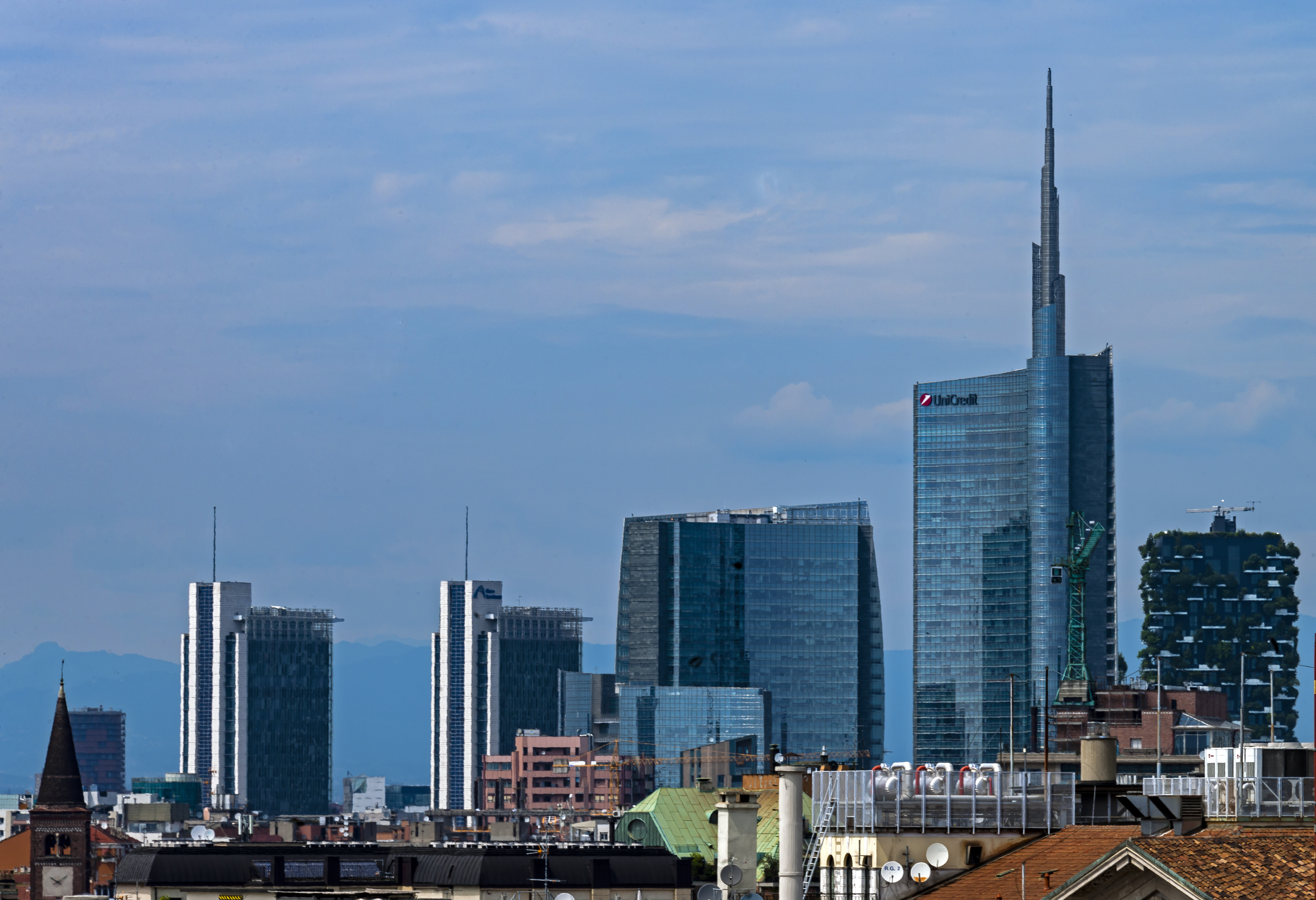
UniCredit Tower (second from the right), head office in Milan

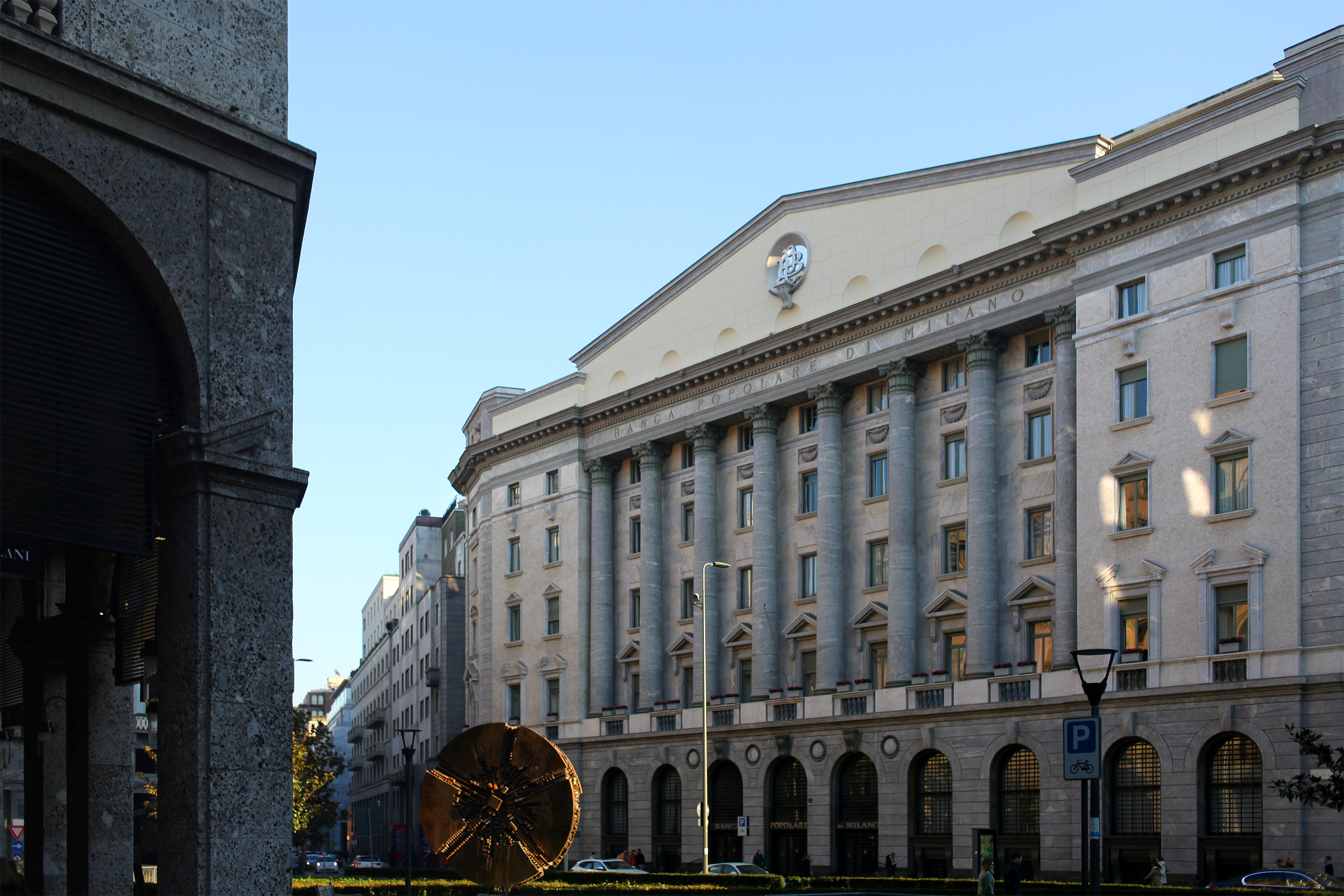
Banco BPM head office, Milan

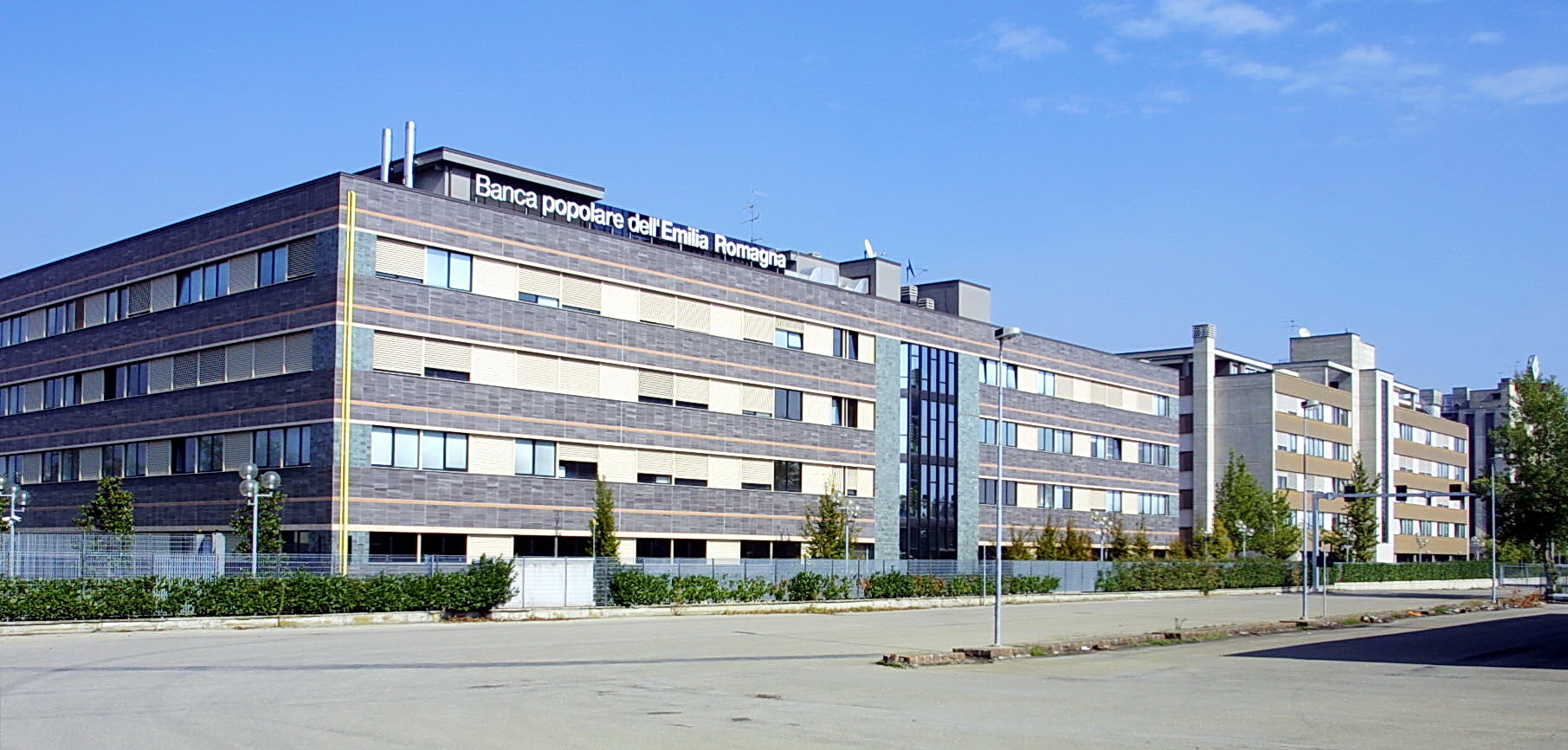
BPER group services center, Modena

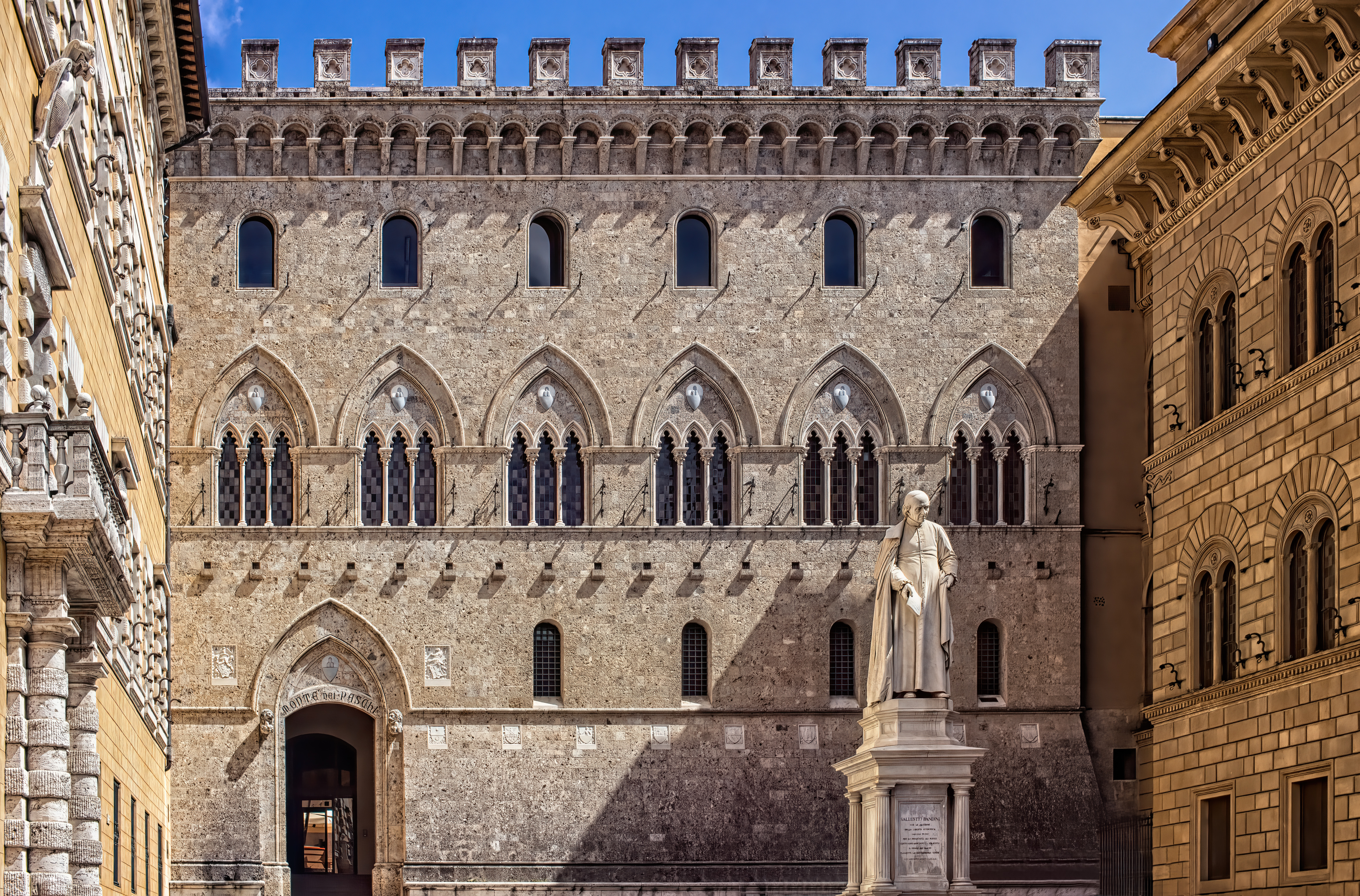
Monte dei Paschi head office, Siena

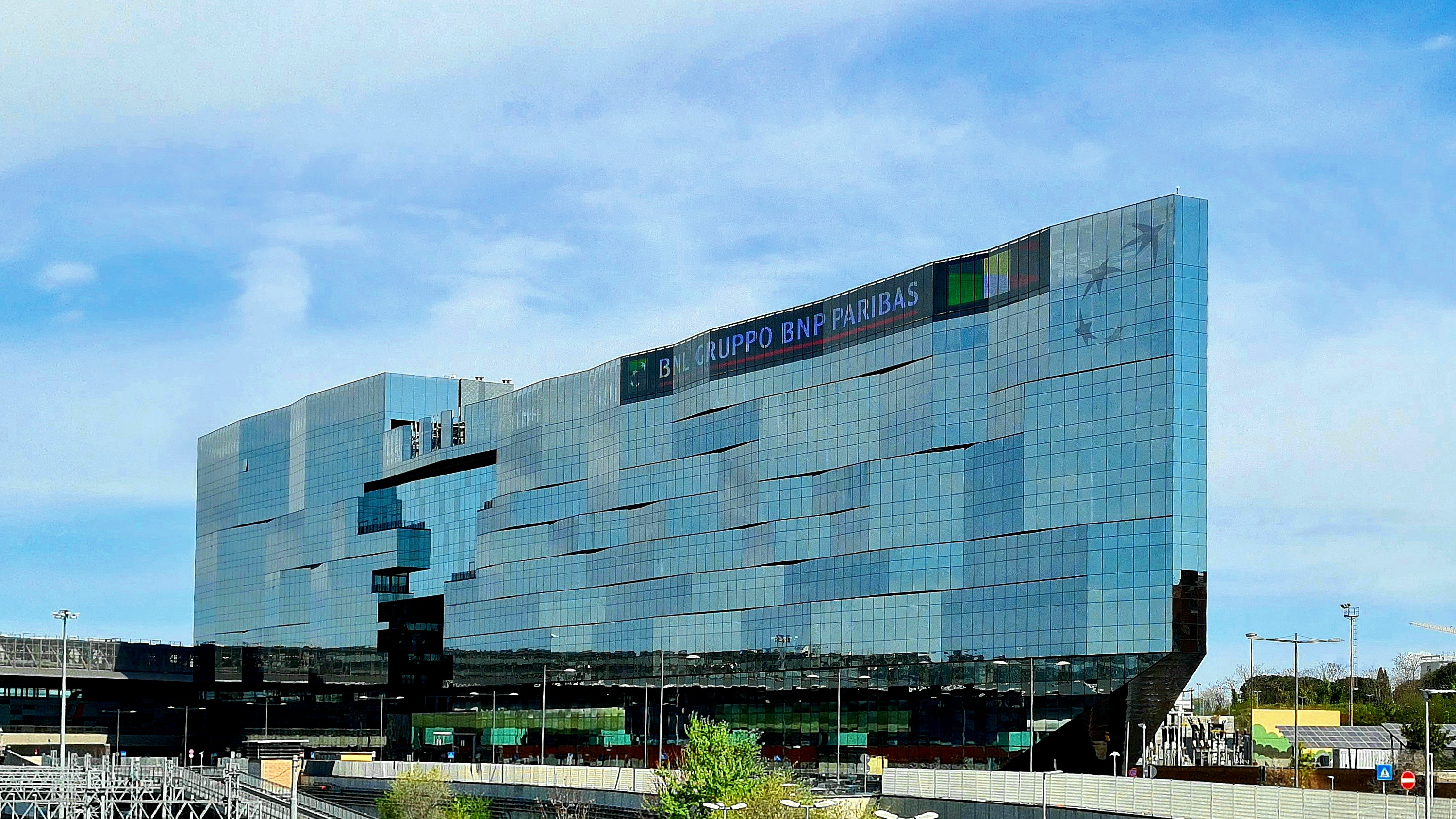
Banca Nazionale del Lavoro head office, Rome

The following list of banks in Italy is to be understood within the framework of the European single market and European banking union, which means that Italy's banking system is more open to cross-border banking operations than peers outside of the EU.

== Policy framework ==
European banking supervision distinguishes between significant institutions (SIs) and less significant institutions (LSIs), with SI/LSI designations updated regularly by the European Central Bank (ECB). Significant institutions are directly supervised by the ECB using joint supervisory teams that involve the national competent authorities (NCAs) of individual participating countries. Less significant institutions are supervised by the relevant NCA on a day-to-day basis, under the supervisory oversight of the ECB. In Italy's case, the NCA is the Bank of Italy.

== Significant institutions ==
As of 1 May 2026, the ECB had the following 10 banking groups based in Italy in its list of significant institutions.

- Banca Mediolanum SpA
- Banca Monte dei Paschi di Siena SpA
- Banco BPM SpA
- BPER Banca SpA
- Cassa Centrale Banca - Credito Cooperativo Italiano SpA
- Credito Emiliano Holding SpA
- FinecoBank SpA
- ICCREA Banca SpA
- Intesa Sanpaolo SpA
- UniCredit SpA

A study published in 2024 assessed that the bank with by far most aggregate assets in Italy (as opposed to total consolidated assets) as of end-2023 was Intesa Sanpaolo at €869 billion, followed by UniCredit (€274 billion), Banco BPM (€202 billion), the Iccrea Group (€175 billion), Crédit Agricole (€160 billion, via Crédit Agricole Italia), BPER (€142 billion), Monte dei Paschi di Siena (€122 billion), BNP Paribas (€103 billion, via Banca Nazionale del Lavoro), the Cassa Centrale group (€90 billion), Mediobanca (€84 billion), Banca Mediolanum (€78 billion), and Credito Emiliano (€68 billion). Italy is also home to subsidiaries of three other euro-area significant institutions, namely Deutsche Bank (via Deutsche Bank SpA), Santander, and Société Générale.

== Less significant institutions ==
As of 1 September 2025, the ECB's list of supervised institutions included 142 Italian LSIs.

=== High-impact LSIs ===
Of these, six were designated by the ECB as "high-impact" on the basis of several criteria including size:

- Banca Generali SpA, subsidiary of Assicurazioni Generali
- Brianza Unione di Luigi Gavazzi e Stefano Lado SAPA, holding entity of Banco di Desio e della Brianza (see below in list of other LSIs)
- Cassa Centrale Raiffeisen dell'Alto Adige SpA (see also below)
- Cassa di Risparmio di Bolzano SpA
- Maurizio Sella SAPA, parent holding entity of Banca Sella Group (see below in list of other LSIs)
- MedioCredito Centrale – Banca del Mezzogiorno SpA, a public-sector bank

=== South Tyrolean Raiffeisen Group ===
39 Italian LSIs, all bearing the name Cassa Raiffeisen, were bound together with the Cassa Centrale Raiffeisen dell'Alto Adige (also known as Raiffeisen Landesbank Südtirol) into the institutional protection scheme (IPS) of the South Tyrolean Raiffeisen Group, one of six IPSs in the euro area.

=== Other Italian LSIs ===
The other 91 domestic Italian LSIs on the ECB list were:

- AideXa Holding SpA
  - Banca AideXa SpA
- Allianz Bank Financial Advisors SpA, subsiidary of Allianz
- Banca Agricola Popolare di Sicilia SCpA
- Banca Cambiano 1884 SpA
- Banca Cassa di Risparmio di Savigliano SpA
- Tiber Investments 2 Sàrl (in Luxembourg)
  - Banca CF+ Credito Fondiario SpA, subsidiary of Tiber
- Banca Credito Attivo SpA
- Banca del Fucino SpA
  - Igea Digital Bank SpA, subsidiary of Banca del Fucino
- Confienza Partecipazioni SpA, owner of Banca del Piemonte
  - Banca del Piemonte SpA
- Banca di Cividale SpA
- Banca di Credito Popolare SCpA
- Banca di Imola SpA
- Banca di Piacenza SCpA
- Banca di Sconto e Conti Correnti di Santa Maria Capua Vetere SpA
- Banca Finanziaria Internazionale SpA
- Nattino Holding Srl, owner of Banca Finnat
  - Banca Finnat Euramerica SpA
- Banca Ifigest SpA
- Banca Ifis SpA
  - Banca Credifarma
  - Illimity Bank SpA
- Banca Investis SpA
- Banca Macerata SpA
- Banca Passadore & C. SpA
- Banca Popolare Commerciale SpA
- Banca Popolare del Cassinate SCpA
- Banca Popolare del Frusinate SCpA
- Banca Popolare del Lazio SC
- Banca Popolare dell'Alto Adige SpA
- Banca popolare delle Province Molisane SCpA
- Banca Popolare di Cortona SCpA
- Banca Popolare di Fondi SC
- Banca Popolare di Lajatico SCpA
- Banca Popolare di Puglia e Basilicata SCpA
- Banca Popolare Etica SCpA
- Banca Popolare Pugliese SCpA
- Privata Holding Srl, owner of Banca Privata Leasing
  - Banca Privata Leasing SpA
- Arepo BP SpA, holding entity of Banca Profilo
  - Banca Profilo SpA
- BPL Holdco Sàrl (in Luxembourg)
  - Banca Progetto SpA, owned by BPL Holdco
- Banca Promos SpA
- Banca Reale SpA, subsidiary of Reale Mutua Assicurazioni
- Banca Santa Giulia SpA
- Banca Sella Holding SpA, part of Banca Sella Group
  - Banca Sella SpA
  - Banca Patrimoni Sella & C. SpA
- Banca Simetica SpA
- Banca Sistema SpA
- Banca Stabiese SpA
- Banca Valsabbina SCpA
- Banco di Credito Paolo Azzoaglio SpA
- Banco di Desio e della Brianza SpA
- Banco di Lucca e del Tirreno SpA
- BdM Banca SpA
- BFF Bank SpA
- Blu Banca SpA
- Cassa di Risparmio di Asti SpA
- Cassa di Risparmio di Fermo SpA
- Cassa di Risparmio di Fossano SpA
- Cassa di Risparmio di Orvieto SpA
- Cassa di Risparmio di Volterra SpA
- Cassa di Sovvenzione e Risparmio fra Il Personale della Banca d'Italia SCpA
- Cassa Lombarda SpA
- Cherry Bank SpA
- Credito Lombardo Veneto SpA
- Ersel Investimenti SpA, owner of Ersel
  - Ersel SpA
- Extrabanca SpA
- Finint SpA
  - Finint Private Bank SpA
- Guber Banca SpA
- IBL Istituto Bancario del Lavoro SpA
- Imprebanca SpA
- Istituto per il credito sportivo e culturale SpA
- La Cassa di Ravenna SpA
- Mediocredito Trentino Alto Adige SpA
- Prader Bank SpA
- Sanfelice 1893 Banca Popolare SCpA
- SC Lowy Financial Sàrl (in Luxembourg)
  - Solution Bank SpA, owned by SC Lowy Financial
- Cirdan Group SpA, owner of Smart Bank
  - Smart Bank SpA
- Suedtirol Bank SpA
- Tyche Bank SpA
- Vivabanca SpA

=== Non-euro-area-controlled LSIs ===
Based on the same ECB list, six Italian LSIs (3 branches and 3 subsidiaries) were affiliates of financial groups based outside the euro area:

- (Sweden) Italian branch of AK Nordic AB
- (Romania) Italian branch of Banca Transilvania SA
- (Libya) Banca Ubae SpA, majority-owned by Libyan Foreign Bank
- (Switzerland) Credit Suisse (Italy) SpA, subsidiary of UBS
- (Sweden) Italian branch of Toyota Material Handling Commercial Finance AB, a Swedish subsidiary of Toyota
- (Switzerland) Zurich Italy Bank SpA, subsidiary of Zurich Insurance Group

== Third-country branches ==
As of 13 October 2025, the following banks established outside the European Economic Area had branches in Italy ("third-country branches" in EU parlance):

- Bank of China
- (Iran) Bank Sepah
- (United States) Citigroup
- (United States) JPMorgan Chase
- (Japan) Mitsubishi UFJ Financial Group
- (Japan) Mizuho Financial Group
- (Iran) Persia International Bank

== Other institutions ==
The Bank of Italy, Cassa Depositi e Prestiti, and BancoPosta are public credit institutions that do not hold a banking license under EU law.

== Defunct banks ==
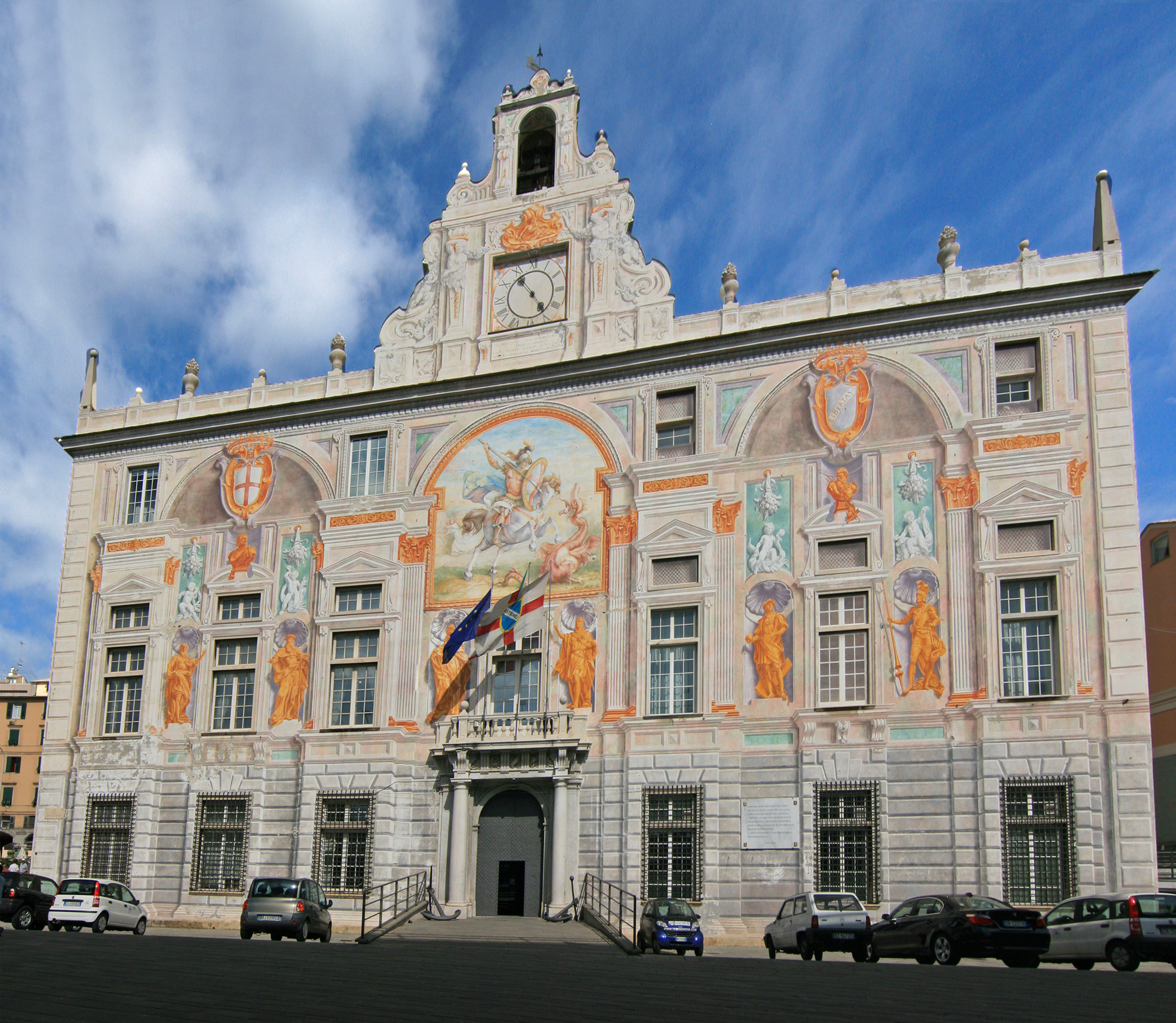
Palazzo San Giorgio in Genoa

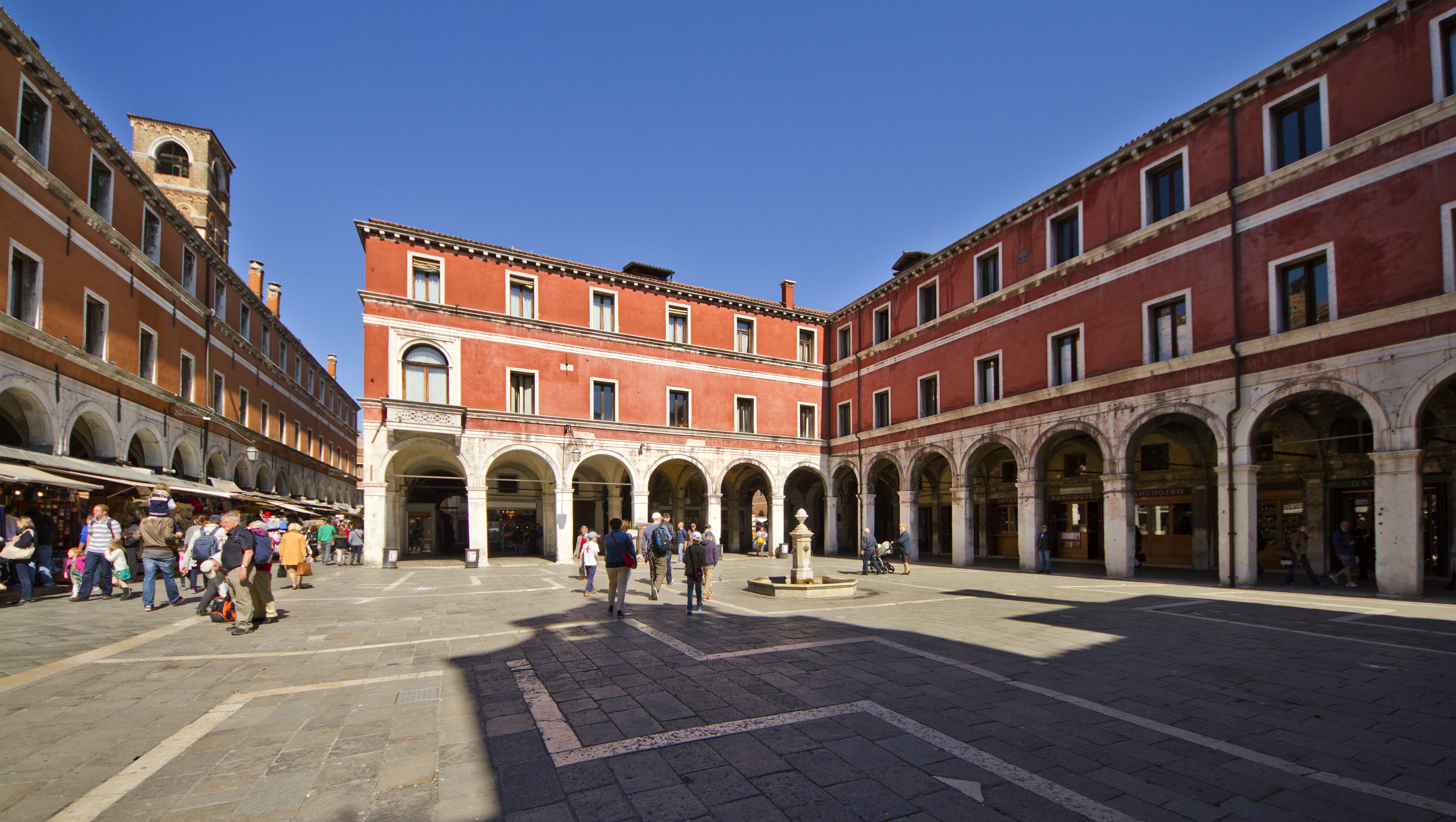
Rialto Square in Venice, former seat of Banco della Piazza di Rialto and of Banco del Giro

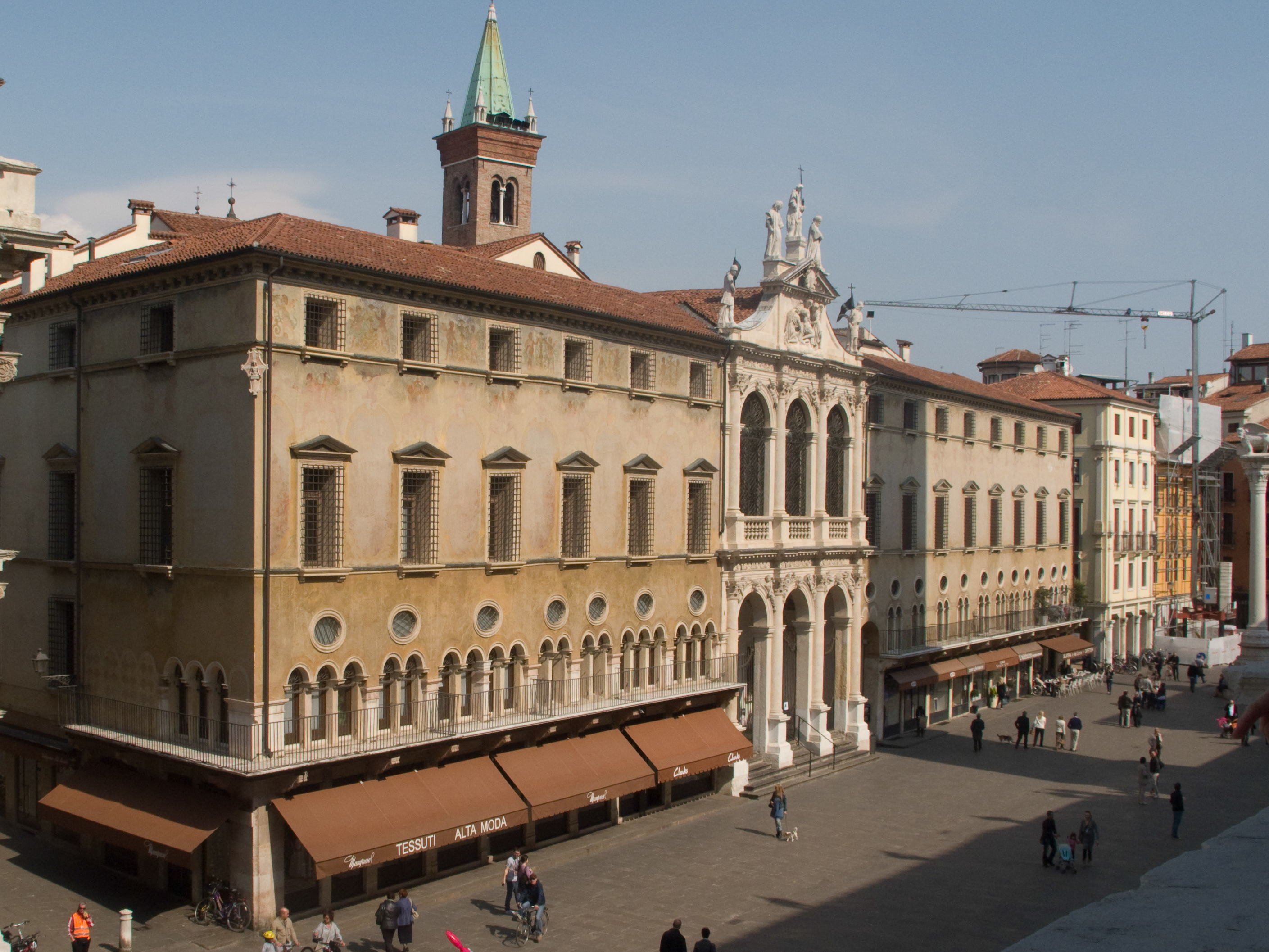
Former seat of the Monte di Pietà di Vicenza

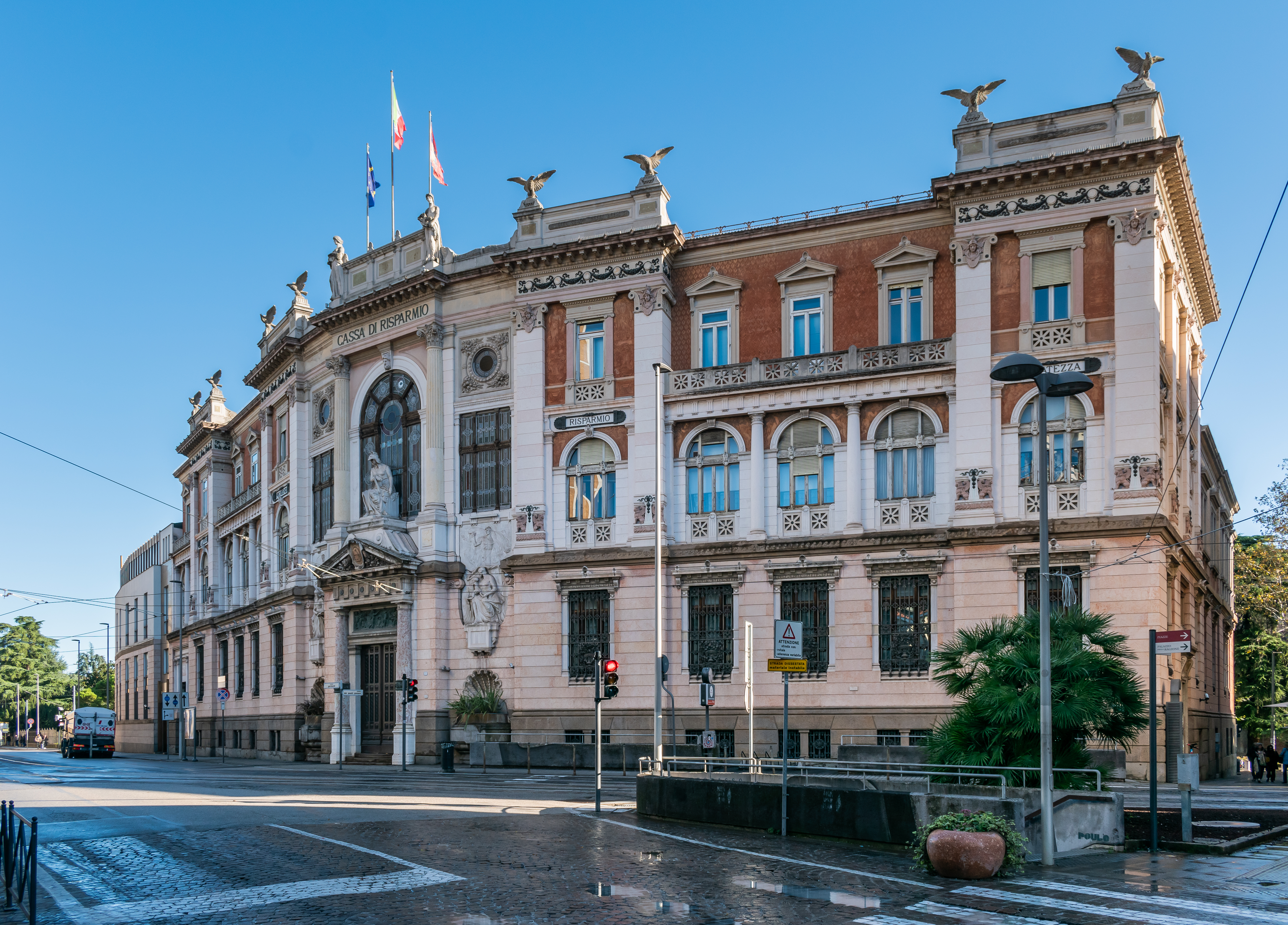
Palazzo Donghi Ponti in Padua, former seat of Cassa di Risparmio

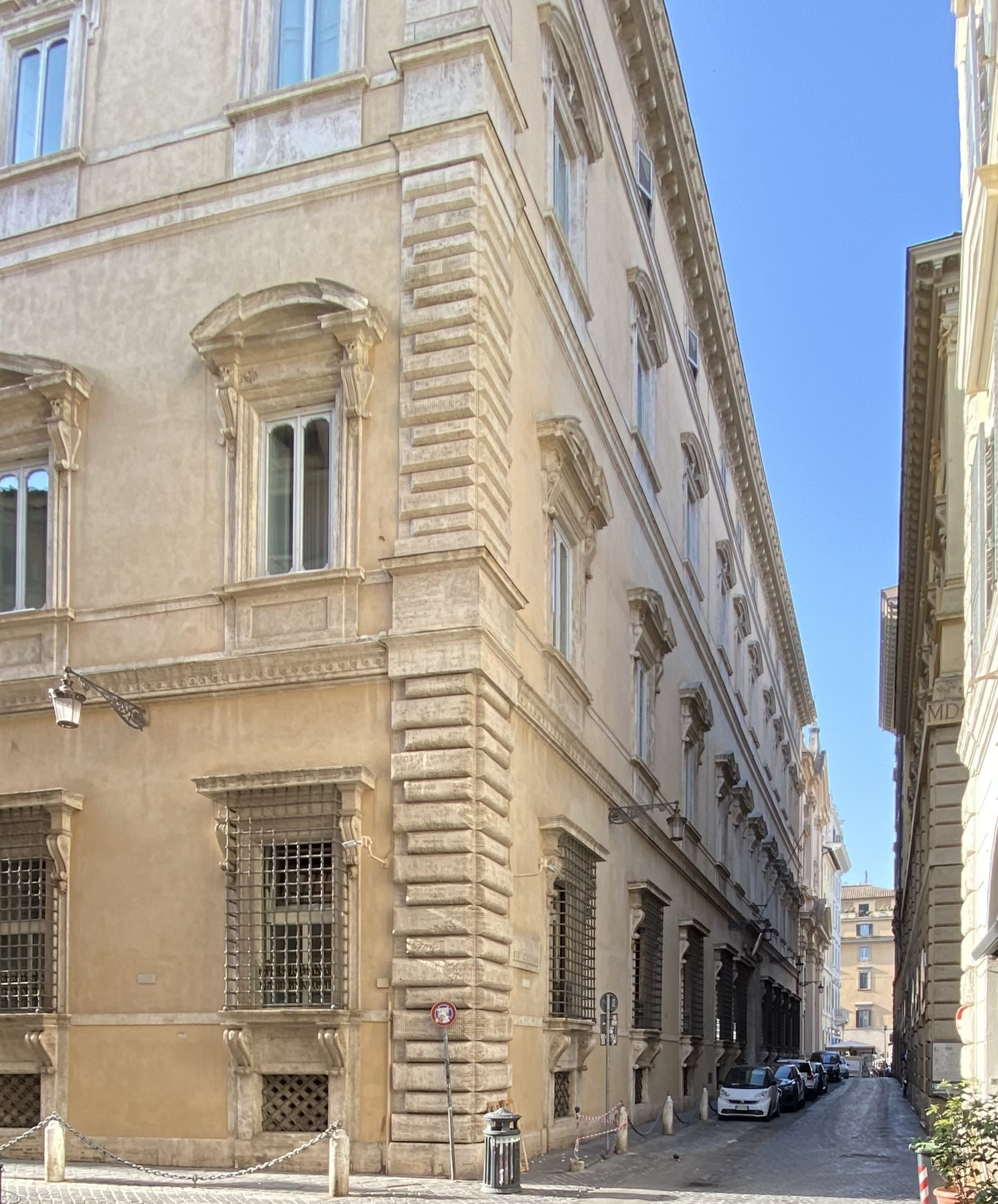
Palazzo Maffei Marescotti in Rome, former seat of Banca Romana

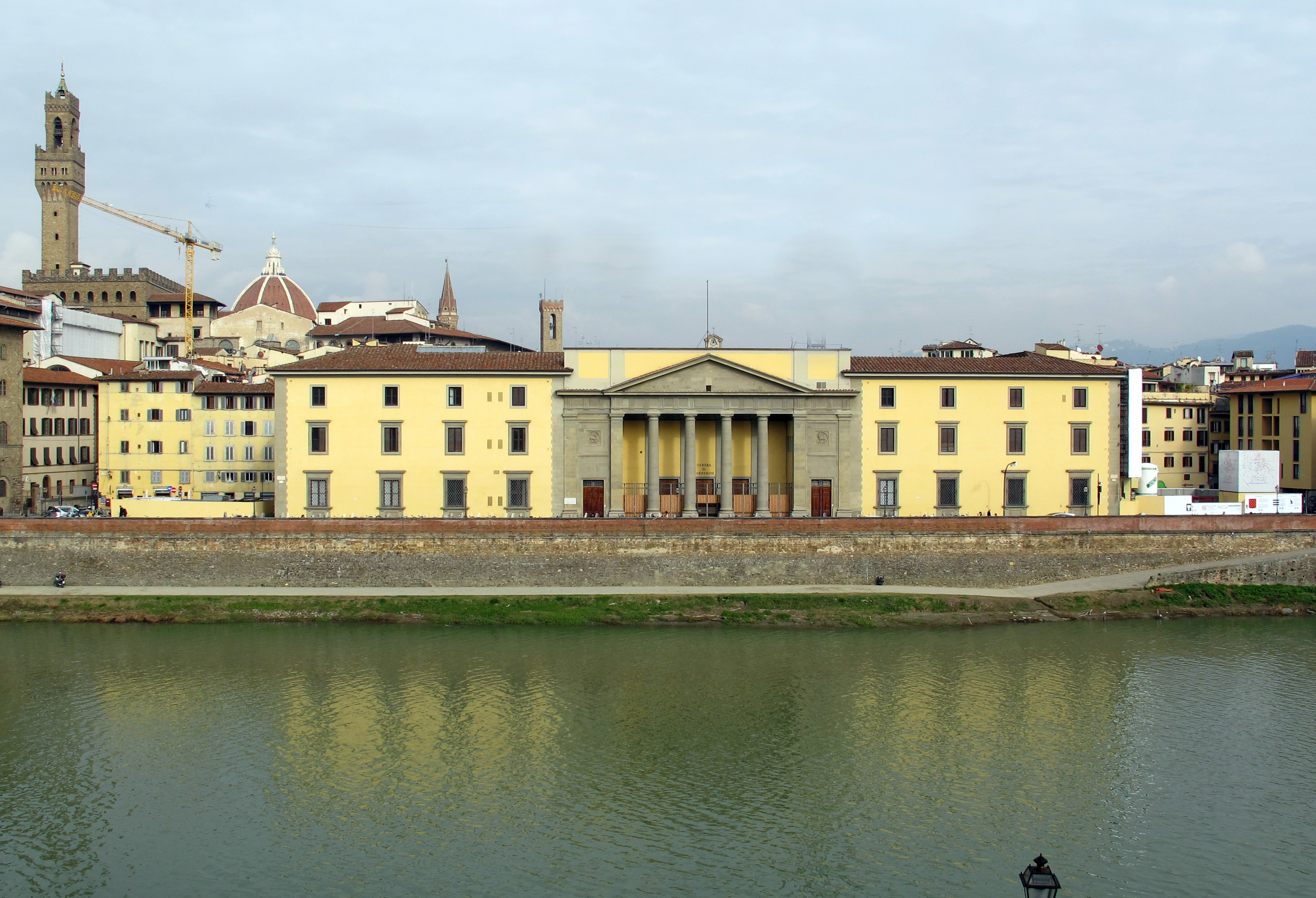
Palazzo della Borsa in Florence, former seat of Banca Nazionale Toscana

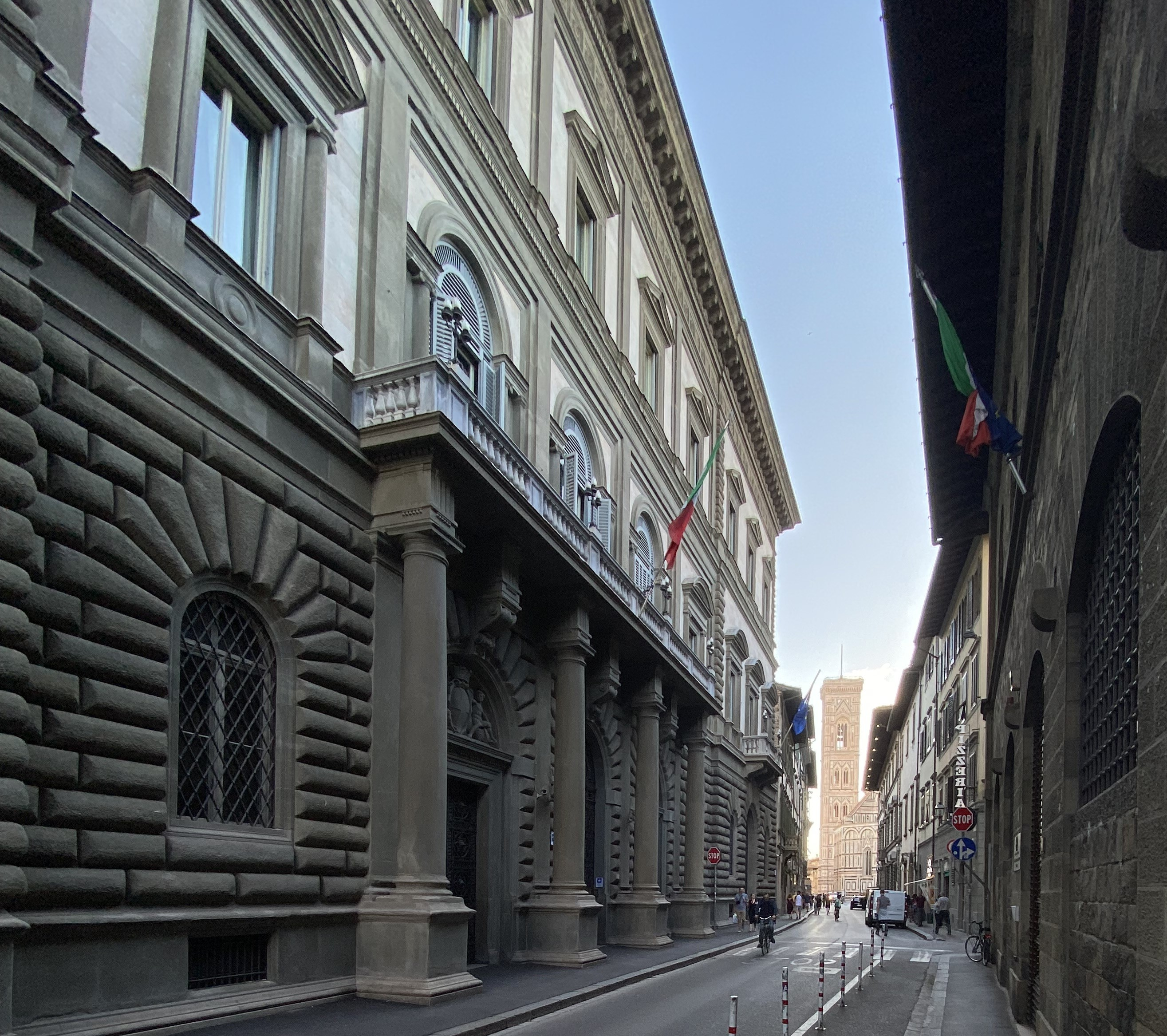
Former temporary seat of the National Bank of the Kingdom of Italy in Florence

Numerous former Italian banks, defined as having been headquartered in the present-day territory of Italy, are documented on Wikipedia in English. They are listed below in chronological order of establishment, divided into two categories depending on whether or not they qualified at some point as early central banks and/or banks of issue. In mainstream narratives of the history of banking, Italy is widely viewed as the birthplace of modern European financial practices during the High Middle Ages and Renaissance, first in the form of family banks and later through municipal public banks known as mount of piety. Moreover, many local savings banks were established in the second and third quarters of the 19th century and, unlike in most other European countries, did not consolidate into a single national network.

=== Central banks and banks of issue ===
- Bank of Saint George (1407-1805)
- Banco di Napoli (1584-2018)
- Banco della Piazza di Rialto (1587-1637)
- Banco del Giro (1619-1797)
- Banco di Santo Spirito (1605-1992)
- Banca Romana (1834-1893)
- Banco di Sicilia (1849-2010)
- National Bank of the Kingdom of Italy (1850-1893)
- Banca Nazionale Toscana (1860-1893)
- Banca Toscana di Credito (1860-1893)

=== Other banks ===
- Lombard banking (13C-16C)
- Gran Tavola (1255-1298)
- Scali family bank (13C-1326)
- Acciaioli family bank (13C-1345)
- Bardi family bank (13C-1345)
- Peruzzi family bank (13C-1345)
- Medici family bank (1397-1494)
- Chigi family bank (15C-16C)
- Monte di Pietà di Perugia (1462-2005)
- Monte di Pietà di Genova (1483-2022)
- Monte di Pietà di Vicenza (1486-1996)
- Monte di Pietà di Parma (1488-2015)
- Monte di Pietà di Faenza (1491-1995)
- Monte di Pietà di Treviso (1496-1872)
- Monte di Pietà di Napoli (1539-1794)
- Compagnia di San Paolo (1563-1998)
- Monte di Pietà di Messina (1581-?)
- Monte di Pietà di Foggia (1588-2006)
- Credito Siciliano (1809-2018)
- Cassa di Risparmio del Veneto (1822-2018)
- Cassa di Risparmio di Venezia (1822-2014)
- Cassa di Risparmio delle Provincie Lombarde (1823-1998)
- Cassa di Risparmio di Verona, Vicenza, Belluno e Ancona (1825-2002)
- Cassa di Risparmio di Torino (1827-2002)
- Cassa di Risparmio di Firenze (1829-2007)
- Cassa di Risparmio di Prato (1830-2010)
- Cassa di Risparmio di San Miniato (1830-2018)
- Cassa di Risparmio di Pistoia e della Lucchesia (1831-1999)
- Cassa di Risparmio di Pisa (1834-2006)
- Cassa di Risparmio di Lucca Pisa Livorno (1835-2011)
- Cassa di Risparmi di Livorno (1836-2006)
- Cassa di Risparmio di Roma (1836-1992)
- Cassa di Risparmio in Bologna (1837-2019)
- Cassa di Risparmio di Alessandria (1838-2012)
- Cassa di Risparmio di Ferrara (1838-2017)
- Cassa dei Risparmi di Forlì e della Romagna (1839-2018)
- Cassa di Risparmio di Rimini (1840-2018)
- Banca delle Marche (1841-2017)
- Cassa di Risparmio di Cesena (1841-2018)
- Cassa di Risparmio di Ascoli Piceno (1842-2013)
- Cassa di Risparmio di Trieste (1842-2002)
- Cassa di Risparmio di Carpi (1843-2005)
- Cassa di Risparmio di Carrara (1843-2015)
- Cassa di Risparmio di Fano (1843-2013)
- Cassa di Risparmio di Jesi (1844-1995)
- Cassa di Risparmio di Civitavecchia (1847-2015)
- Società Bancaria Italiana (1850-1915)
- Cassa di Risparmio di Vercelli (1851-1994)
- Cassa di Risparmio di Reggio Emilia (1852-1999)
- Banco di Sconto e Sete (1853-1892)
- Cassa di Risparmio di Imola (1855-2008)
- Cassa di Risparmio della Provincia di Viterbo (1855-2015)
- Cassa di Risparmio di Cuneo (1855-1995)
- Cassa di Risparmio di Biella (1856-1994)
- Cassa di Risparmio della Provincia dell'Aquila (1859-2013)
- Cassa di Risparmio di Piacenza e Vigevano (1860-1992)
- Banca Carime (1861-2017)
- Cassa di Risparmio di Calabria e Lucania (1861-1997)
- Cassa di Risparmio di Loreto (1861-2017)
- Sicilcassa (1861-1997)
- Banca Teatina (1862-2018)
- Banca di Credito Italiano (1863-1893)
- Credito Mobiliare (1863-1894)
- Banca Popolare di Lodi (1864-2011)
- Banca Popolare di Verona (1867-2011)
- Banca Popolare di Bergamo (1869-2003)
- Banca Popolare di Crema (1870-2011)
- Banco di Chiavari e della Riviera Ligure (1870-2008)
- Credito Italiano (1870-2002)
- Banca Agricola Mantovana (1871-2008)
- Banca Caripe (1871-2016)
- Banca Generale (1871-1894)
- Banca Popolare di Novara (1871-2011)
- Banca di Valle Camonica (1872-2007)
- Banca Popolare di Lecco (1872-1993)
- Cassa di Risparmio di Vignola (1872-2010)
- Banca dell'Adriatico (1875-2016)
- Banca Tiberina (1877-1895)
- Veneto Banca (1877-2017)
- Banco di Roma (1880-1992)
- Banca Tirrenica (1881-2017)
- Banca Nuova (1883-2018)
- Credito Agrario Bresciano (1883-1998)
- Banca Popolare dell'Alto Lazio (1884-1988)
- Banca di Legnano (1887-2013)
- Banca Popolare Commercio e Industria (1888-2016)
- Banca San Paolo di Brescia (1888-1998)
- Banca Popolare di Ancona (1891-2003)
- Credito Bergamasco (1891-2014)
- Banca Cattolica del Veneto (1892-1989)
- Banca Commerciale Italiana (1894-2003)
- Banca Popolare di Spoleto (1895-2017)
- Banco Ambrosiano (1896-1982)
- Credito Romagnolo (1896-1995)
- Banca Cattolica di Trento (1899-1935)
- Banca Cattolica di Molfetta (1902-2001)
- Banca Toscana (1904-2009)
- Credito Valtellinese (1908-2021)
- Cassa di Risparmio di Tortona (1911-2006)
- Banca Italiana di Sconto (1915-1921)
- Crediop (1919-2023)
- Banca Nazionale dell'Agricoltura (1921-2000)
- Banca Nazionale di Credito (1922-1930)
- Istituto Mobiliare Italiano and Banca IMI (1931-1998)
- Banca di Trento e Bolzano (1934-2015)
- ISVEIMER (1938-1996)
- Banca Tercas (1939-2016)
- Credito Artigiano (1946-2012)
- Cassa per il Mezzogiorno (1950-1984)
- Banca di Credito Sardo (1953-2014)
- Banca Popolare del Molise (1958-1998)
- Interbanca (1961-2017)
- Banca Popolare di Lanciano e Sulmona (1962-2013)
- Banca Italease (1968-2015)
- Nuovo Banco Ambrosiano (1982-1989)
- Banca Popolare di Brescia (1983-1999)
- Hypo Alpe-Adria-Bank Italy (1986-2016)
- Banca del Monte di Lombardia (1987-1995)
- Banco di San Giorgio (1987–2012)
- Unipol Banca (1987-2019)
- Banco Ambrosiano Veneto (1989-1998)
- Carimonte Banca (1991-1995)
- Banca di Roma (1992-2002)
- Banca Mediterranea (1992-2004)
- Casse Emiliano Romagnole (1992-2000)
- Unicredito (1994-1998)
- Banca Regionale Europea (1995-2016)
- Banca Antonveneta (1996-2007)
- Rolo Banca (1996-2002)
- Banca del Salento – Credito Popolare Salentino (1997-2002)
- Neos Finance (1997-2013)
- Banca Intesa (1998-2007)
- Banca Lombarda e Piemontese (1998-2007)
- Sanpaolo IMI (1998-2007)
- Banco di Brescia (1999-2017)
- Bipop Carire (1999-2008)
- Banca Popolare di Mantova (2000-2016)
- Cardine Banca (2000-2002)
- Capitalia (2002-2008)
- UniCredit Banca (2002-2010)
- Cassa di Risparmio del Friuli Venezia Giulia (2003-2018)

== See also ==
- History of banking in Italy
- List of banks in the euro area
- List of banks in Europe
