= Banca Sella Group =

Italian private credit institution

Banca Sella Holding
- Trade name: Banca Sella Group
- Formerly: Gaudenzo Sella & C.; Banca Sella S.p.A.
- Company type: Società per azioni
- ISIN: IT0005124398
- Industry: Financial services
- Founded: 23 August 1886
- Founder: Sella family
- Headquarters: Biella, Italy
- Number of locations: 400 branches (2020)
- Key people: Giovanni Petrella; (chairman): Pietro Sella; (CEO)
- Services: Retail, private and investment banking, insurance, investment management
- Net income: (2015)
- Total assets: €24,119 billion (Q2 2025)
- Total equity: ▲€831.673 million (2015)
- Number of employees: ▲ < 5000 (2020)
- Subsidiaries: Banca Sella; Banca Patrimoni Sella; Sella SGR; Sella Leasing; Sella Personal Credit; Fabrick
- Capital ratio: ▲11.59% (CET1 - 2015)
- Website: sellagroup.eu
- Footnotes / references data in consolidated basis

Banca Sella Holding S.p.A. is an Italian holding company for the Banca Sella Group (Italian: Gruppo Banca Sella). The main company of the group was Banca Sella S.p.A., an Italian bank based in Biella, Piedmont.

According to research by Mediobanca, Banca Sella Group was ranked the 20th largest bank in Italy by total assets as of 31 December 2024.

== History ==
=== Origins of Banca Sella ===
The story of Gruppo Banca Sella has its roots in 1886, when Gaudenzio Sella, inspired by the principles of his uncle Quintino Sella, along with six other brothers and cousins, founded in Biella the Gaudenzio Sella & C., (the current Banca Sella Group), in order to "carry on trade as the banking discounts, advances, current accounts, buying and selling of securities, etc. ", as shown in the deed. The senior managers of the bank was newly appointed Gaudenzio Sella, who remained at the helm of the institute until his death.

=== Expansion ===
The first branches outside Biella date back to the late '30s (Ponzone, Trivero, Cossato). In 1949 the bank changed its name becoming a Società per azioni (limited company) and the brothers Ernesto and Giorgio Sella respectively assumed the position of chairman and CEO. In 1962 changed its name to Banca Sella S.p.A. In 1974, the death of Ernesto, Giorgio Sella became the chairman; chief executive officer was entrusted to Maurizio Sella, son of Ernesto.

Under the leadership of Maurizio Sella, Banca Sella spread throughout the country, up to more than 300 branches in the first decade of 2000.

Over the years the Bank has acquired small local institutions in the North East and South Italy, and have been established operating companies in various businesses such as leasing, consumer finance, asset management companies, non-life insurance. In 1992 Gruppo Banca Sella was found.

In 1997, it takes place the launch of internet banking services and in 2000 the brand www.sella.it.

On the death of Giorgio Sella (in 2000) Maurizio Sella became the chairman, while Pietro Sella (born in 1968) he became the CEO in 2002. (after the old "Banca Sella S.p.A." became "Banca Sella Holding S.p.A.", and the creation of new "Banca Sella S.p.A." as a subsidiary in 2006, they became the chairman and CEO of both the holding and the bank; in 2013 Donato Valz Gen was appointed as the CEO of the bank but not the holding)

On 1 January 2005 a new subsidiary Banca Patrimoni e Investimenti was formed by the merger of Sella Investimenti Banca (bank founded in Turin in 2001 and specializes in private banking customers) and Gestnord Intermediazione.

=== Birth of Banca Sella Holding and recent history ===
As part of a restructuring of the group, on 1 January 2006 the [old] Banca Sella S.p.A. (P.IVA 01709430027) was transformed into a financial holding company of the group and changed its name to Sella Holding Banca S.p.A., having conferred the banking business to a new subsidiary that it has taken so the name of [new] Banca Sella S.p.A. (P.I. 02224410023).

On 1 April 2006 from the merger of Fiduciaria Sella S.I.M.p.A. (dynamic trust founded in 1992, and specializes in individual asset management: asset management in funds and securities) in Gestnord Fondi SGR SpA (born in 1983, and specializes in the collective management of assets: mutual funds, pension funds and SICAV) born Sella Gestioni SGR S.p.A. thus incorporating into one company the group's activities in asset management for retail customers.

In October 2006, for the acquisition of eight branches that Banca Sella held in the region of Veneto, Banca Bovio Calderari (an indirect subsidiary of the group via Bovio Calderari Finanziaria S.p.A.) assumes the new name of Banca Sella Nord Est Bovio Calderari (Sella North East – Bovio Calderari Bank). After the deals the group owned 80.03% shares of Bovio Calderari Finanziaria (BC Finanziaria), BC Finanziaria had a controlling interests in the new bank.

On 1 June 2007 Sella Gestioni SGR formed a new subsidiary, Sella Capital Management SGR who was in charge of asset management for institutional clients.

On 12 November 2007 Banca Patrimoni Sella & C. was formed by the merger by absorption of Sella Consult S.I.M.p.A. into Banca Patrimoni e Investimenti; after the transaction the group owned 68.190% shares of the subsidiary, increasing from 56.114%.

In 2007 CBA Vita, a subsidiary of the group, with HDI Assicurazioni, creates InChiaro, a joint venture dedicated to bancassurance (insurance services that integrated with bank); in 2016 all shares held by Banca Sella Group in CBA Vita have been sold to HDI Assicurazioni.

On 31 March 2008, "Sella Holding Banca" changed its name to Banca Sella Holding S.p.A.. On 1 June 2008 Banca Sella Sud Arditi Galati (Sella South – Arditi Galati Bank) was found by the absorption of Banca di Palermo S.p.A. (a subsidiary of the group) and the branches of Banca Sella S.p.A. in Campania into Banca Arditi Galati S.p.A.

In April 2009 a new subsidiary Sella Servizi Bancari was formed in order to centralize the back office of the group.

On 30 May 2011 and on 1 October 2012 Banca Sella Sud Arditi Galati and Banca Sella Nord Est Bovio Calderari were absorbed into Banca Sella S.p.A.. As of 31 December 2010, the group owned 60.13% of Sella South – Arditi Galati Bank and 56.75% shares of Sella North East – Bovio Calderari Bank as of 31 December 2011. The group bought the remaining minority interests from other investors.

In 2013, SellaLab was founded as the innovation center of the Sella Group, aimed at established startups and corporate companies, with the goal of supporting open innovation and digital transformation processes. Among its initiatives is HYPE, the first mobile-only electronic money solution in Italy, launched in 2015.

In 2017, the Group promoted the creation of the Fintech District in Milan, a gateway to the Italian fintech ecosystem that brings together startups, entrepreneurs, financial institutions, investors, and universities to foster the development of the financial industry of the future and the growth of companies in the sector.

In mid-2017, Banca Sella launched the first open banking platform in Italy (and among the first internationally) through APIs (Application Programming Interfaces), opening its technological and information infrastructures to businesses and startups, ahead of the European directive PSD2, which came into force in January 2018.

In November 2017, the Group changed its logo and name, rebranding from “Gruppo Banca Sella” to “Sella Group.”

In 2018, it launched Fabrick, an open financial ecosystem that enables and promotes collaboration among banks, corporates, and fintech companies in order to create innovative solutions for end customers through the Fabrick Platform API.

During 2018, the Group also acquired:

- Vipera Plc, a company listed on London's AIM market (following the acquisition, the shares were subsequently delisted) and the parent company of an international group of firms specializing in the provision of mobile digital solutions and services for the financial and retail markets.
- Kubique S.p.A., a fintech company specialized in providing platforms and software solutions for managing supply chain finance services for businesses.
- Smartika S.p.A., a company operating in the peer-to-peer lending sector, offering private lending services through online platforms.

== Main group companies ==
As of 31 December 2025

The main companies in the Banca Sella Group are:

- Banca Sella Holding S.p.A. (parent company of the Gruppo Banca Sella);
  - Banca Sella S.p.A.;
  - Banca Patrimoni Sella & C. ( bank specializing in the management of private and institutional clients);
  - Sella SGR (asset management);
  - Sella Leasing (financial leasing);
  - Sella Personal Credit (consumer credit);
  - Sella Fiduciaria (trust company and family office of the Group);
  - Fabrick (innovative solutions through the Fabrick Platform API);
  - Fintech District (a gateway to the Italian fintech ecosystem that brings together startups, entrepreneurs, financial institutions, investors, and universities)
  - Sella Broker
  - Hype S.p.A. (established in 2019, it offers Hype, an electronic money account for innovative, paperless, smartphone-oriented money management);
  - Centrico S.p.A. (established in 2019, it provides banks and fintech companies with a proven open core banking platform).

== See also ==
- List of banks in the euro area
- List of banks in Italy
