= Banca dell'Adriatico =

- Company type: subsidiary of a listed company
- Industry: Financial services
- Founded: 1875 (Banca Popolare Pesarese); 1989 (B.P. Pesarese e Ravennate); 1994 (Banca Popolare dell'Adriatico); 2006 (Banca dell'Adriatico)
- Defunct: 16 May 2016
- Fate: absorbed by the parent company
- Headquarters: Pesaro, Marche, Italy
- Key people: Giandomenico Di Sante (chairman); Roberto Dal Mas (general manager)
- Services: Retail banking
- Net income: ▲€10,290,134 (2015)
- Total assets: ▲€7,056,377,742 (2015)
- Total equity: ▲€375,518,886 (2015)
- Owner: CAER (1997–2000); Cardine Banca (2000–2002); Sanpaolo IMI (2002–2006); Intesa Sanpaolo (2007–2016)
- Parent: Intesa Sanpaolo
- Website: Official website
- Footnotes / references source

Banca dell'Adriatico S.p.A. was an Italian regional bank based in Pesaro, Marche. The bank was a subsidiary of Intesa Sanpaolo.

== History ==
Banca Popolare Pesarese was found in Pesaro, Marche in 1875, at that time a cooperative bank. In 1989 the bank was merged with Romagnol company Cooperativa di Bagnacavallo e Fusignano, becoming Banca Popolare Pesarese e Ravennate. In 1994 Banca Popolare Abruzzese Marchigiana (itself a merger of Banca Popolare di Teramo, based in Abruzzo and Banca Popolare di San Benedetto del Tronto, based in Marche) and Banca Popolare di Castel di Sangro based in Abruzzo) joined the group as Banca Popolare dell'Adriatico (Popular Bank of Adriatic coasts).

The bank was acquired by Cassa di Risparmio in Bologna in 1997 (Carisbo; for 47.08% shares), which was part of Casse Emiliano Romagnole Group (CAER). CAER also hold 5% shares directly. In 1997 the bank also transformed from a cooperative society to società per azioni (limited company). The bank followed the merger of the parent company to Cardine Banca Group in 2000. Carisbo retained as a sub-holding company, while Cardine owned an additional 12.921%. In 2002 the bank followed the parent company to become part of Sanpaolo IMI Group, and again part of Intesa Sanpaolo in 2007.

In 2006, Banca Popolare dell'Adriatico was absorbed into the parent company concurrently with the formation of Sanpaolo Banca dell'Adriatico, which received the branches from Sanpaolo IMI and Banca Popolare dell'Adriatico in the region of Marche, Abruzzo and Molise. However former branches located in Romagna, were transferred to Cassa dei Risparmi di Forlì instead. In 2007 the name was changed to Banca dell'Adriatico.

In 2013 Banca dell'Adriatico absorbed Cassa di Risparmio di Ascoli Piceno (Carisap).

In 2016 the bank was absorbed into the parent company.

== Sponsorship ==
The bank sponsored San Benedetto Tennis Cup which was previously sponsored by Carisap.

== See also ==
- Banca Popolare FriulAdria, a Friuli-based subsidiary of Crédit Agricole
- Banca Popolare di Ancona, a Marche-based subsidiary of UBI Banca
- Nuova Banca delle Marche
- List of banks in Italy
