= Istituto Mobiliare Italiano =

Former Italian bank (1931–1998)

The Istituto Mobiliare Italiano (IMI, lit. 'Italian Securities Institution') was a public financial institution in Italy based in Rome, founded in 1931, privatized in the 1990s and eventually acquired in 1998 by Istituto Bancario San Paolo di Torino. Its name survives in Banca IMI, the investment banking arm of Intesa Sanpaolo.

== Overview ==
The Istituto Mobiliare Italiano was established as a public body on 13 November 1931, with involvement of Alberto Beneduce and Felice Guarneri, in response to the European banking crisis of 1931 in a context of distress of the three main Italian universal banks, namely Banca Commerciale Italiana, Banco di Roma, and Credito Italiano. It was led by Teodoro Mayer until 14 March 1936. IMI's activity specialized in credit for industrial activities in the long and medium term, issuing bonds to finance itself. In its initial half-decade of activity, however, IMI granted only two loans, one to the Acciaierie di Terni and the other to Italgas, while the other two public credit institutions created in the same period, Crediop and ICIPU, largely replaced the banks in their respective areas of focus.

From 1947 on, IMI was one of the banks most involved in Italy's post-war reconstruction. The authorities of the Marshall Plan did not trust the funds to be managed directly by the Italian State, fearing that they could be diverted for political purposes. The governor of the Bank of Italy, Donato Menichella, who was a member of the Italian delegation that negotiated the Marshall Plan implementation, proposed that the funds be managed by IMI. IMI not only received and paid the funds, but also was tasked with selecting the companies that would receive financing. In 1950, IMI moved to a head office building on Via delle Quattro Fontane, designed by architecture firm Studio Passarelli.

In 1969, IMI began managing government funds dedicated to the development of industrial research, with a team of dedicated engineers that was unique in Italy and had ability to evaluate industrial projects on the basis of underlying scientific and technological contents. That same year, it moved to a new head office building in the EUR development outside Rome, Via dell'Arte 19, also by Studio Passarelli.

In 1982, IMI participated in the foundation of the Nuovo Banco Ambrosiano, from whose capital it exited in 1985. By then, the largest shareholders of IMI were Cassa Depositi e Prestiti (49.9 percent), INPS (10.4 percent), and INA (9.3 percent).

In 1991, IMI was transformed into a joint-stock company, and in January 1994 it was listed on the Milan Stock Exchange and the New York Stock Exchange. On 31 July 1998, IMI merged with Istituto Bancario San Paolo di Torino to form Sanpaolo IMI.

== See also ==
- Instituto de Crédito Oficial
- List of banks in Italy
