= Antonio Beccadelli =

Antonio Beccadelli may refer to:

- Antonio Beccadelli (poet) (1394–1471), Italian poet, canon lawyer, scholar, diplomat, and chronicler
- Antonio Beccadelli (painter) (1718–1803), Italian painter and art merchant from Bologna
