= Banca Toscana =

Former Florence-based bank

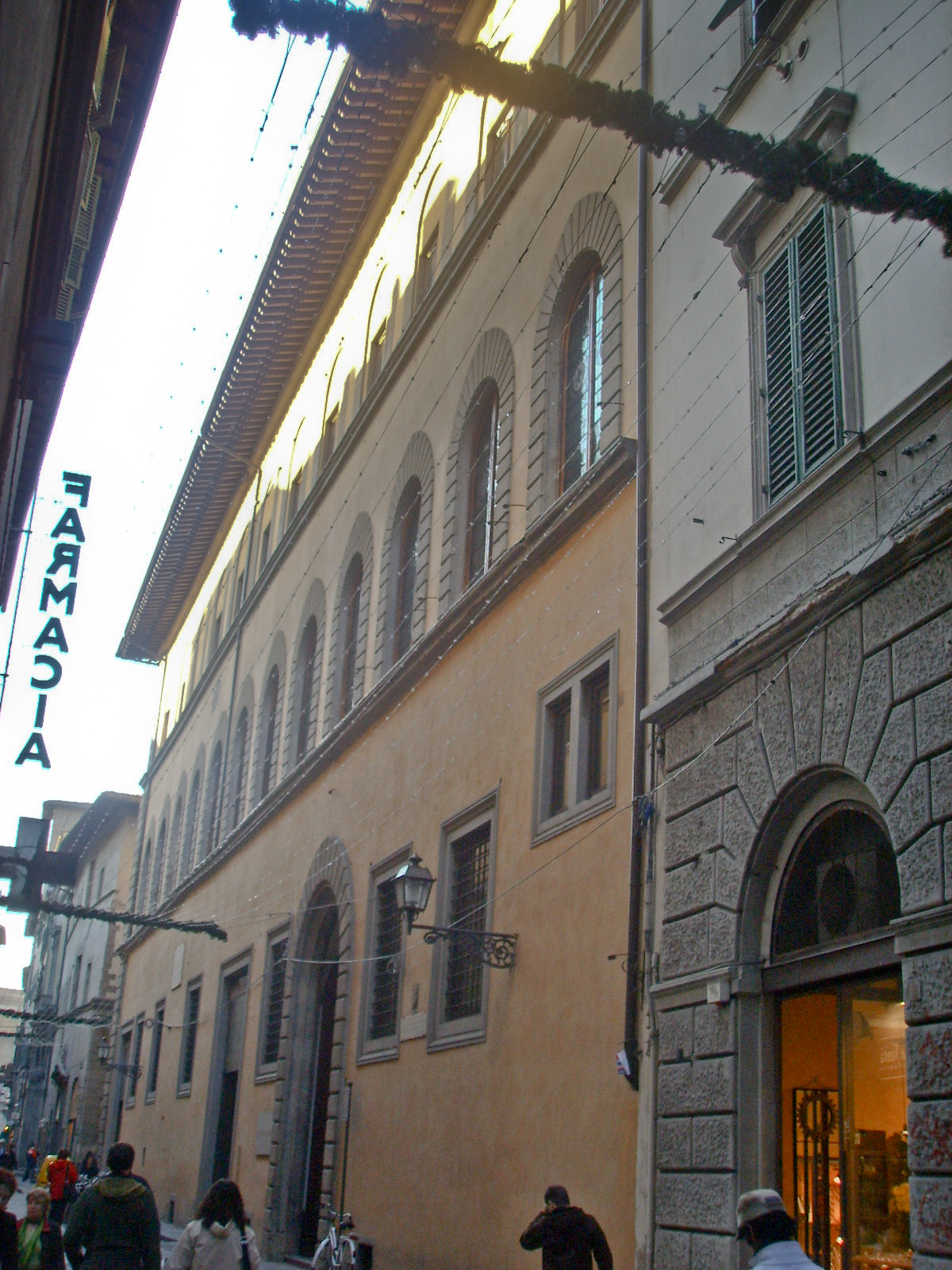
Palazzo Portinari-Salviati in Florence, the bank's seat from 1923 to 2008

Banca Toscana was a regional credit institution headquartered in Florence, known under that name between 1930 and 2009. It was initially established in 1904 as Piccolo Credito Toscano, then was branded Credito Toscano between 1921 and 1930, when it absorbed rival Banca di Firenze. From 1929, it was controlled by Banca Monte dei Paschi di Siena, which fully absorbed it in 2009.

== Overview ==
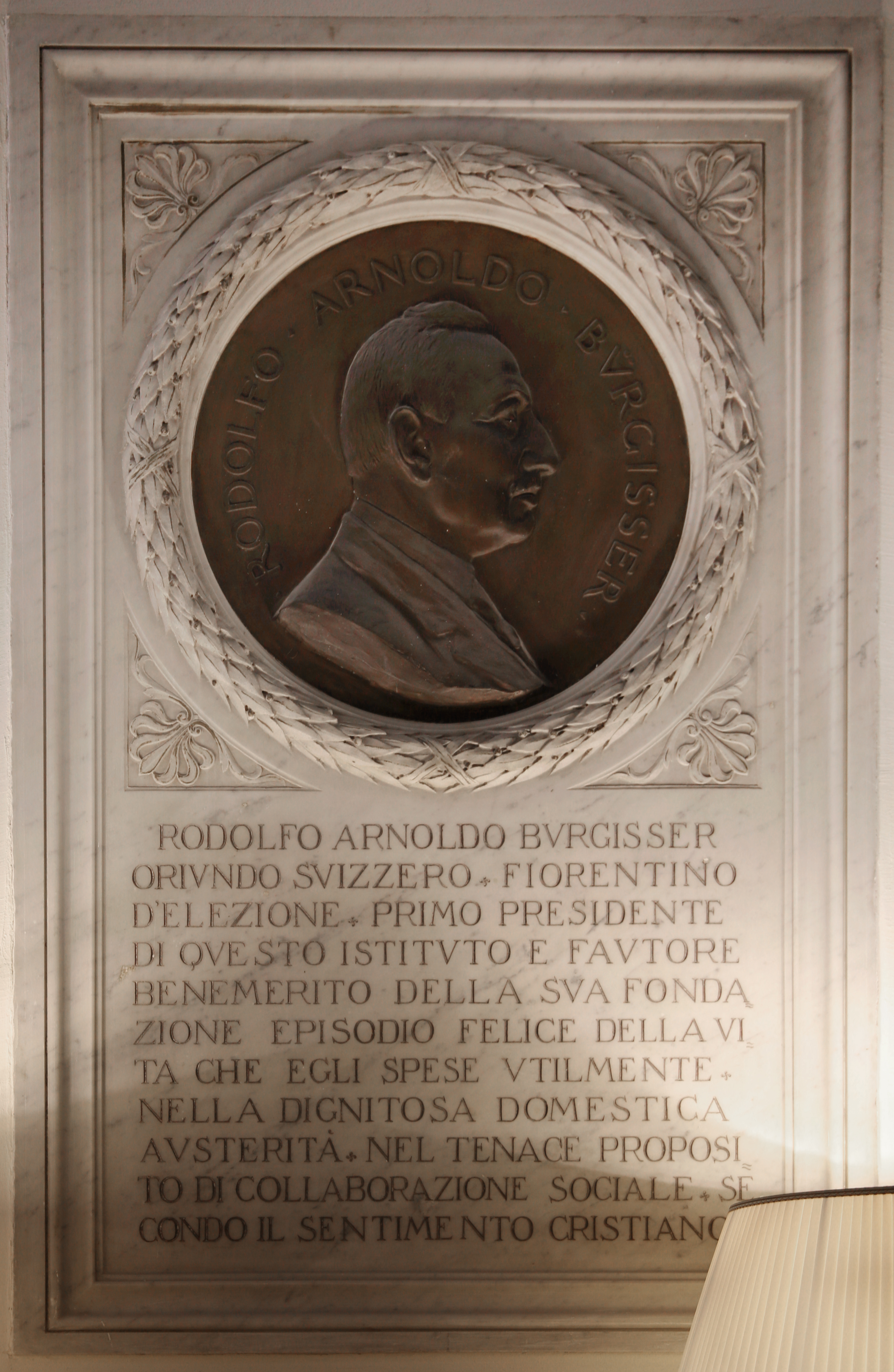
Plaque honoring Rodolfo Arnoldo Bürgisser, the bank's founding chairman, inside Palazzo Portinari-Salviati

Piccolo Credito Toscano was established in Florence on 4 April 1904 as a cooperative bank, with input from local Catholic institutions and from Rodolfo Arnoldo Bürgisser, a Swiss businessman who had founded the Libreria Editrice Fiorentina two years earlier and became the bank's first chairman. It was initially located on Via del Corso 3 in the historic center of Florence.

In 1921, it was rebranded as Credito Toscano following the acquisition of Piccolo Credito Tirreno in Pisa. In 1923, it was reorganized as a joint-stock company and acquired the historic Palazzo Portinari-Salviati across the street as its new head office.

In 1928-1929, Credito Toscano was acquired by Banca Monte dei Paschi di Siena. On 4 June 1930, Credito Toscano in turn merged with Banca di Firenze (established since 1913 in the nearby Palazzo Pazzi) and Banca degli Esercenti e delle Piccole Industrie (lit. 'Bank of Merchants and Small Industry'), and was renamed Banca Toscana SpA.

In 1975, the bank opened a branch in La Spezia, then expanded nationwide including a Roman branch opening in 1979. In 1985, Monte dei Paschi placed 30 percent of the bank's equity capital with market investors, and in May 1986 Banca Toscana was listed on the Italian Stock Exchange. In 1990, it acquired majority ownership in Banco di Perugia, which it fully absorbed in 1991. It also absorbed Banca Popolare della Marsica on 20 November 2000, with 22 branches in Abruzzo and Lazio.

In 2002, Banca Monte dei Paschi di Siena reacquired full control of Banca Toscana. As of late 2005, Banca Toscana had 428 branches, mainly in the centre-south of the peninsula with presence also in Liguria and Lombardy. On 30 March 2009, the bank's legal entity was merged into Monte dei Paschi. In April 2021, Monte dei Paschi announced intent to sell the Banca Toscana brand together with 150 branches.

== See also ==
- Banking in Italy
- List of banks in Italy
