= Cassa di Risparmio in Bologna =

Former Italian bank

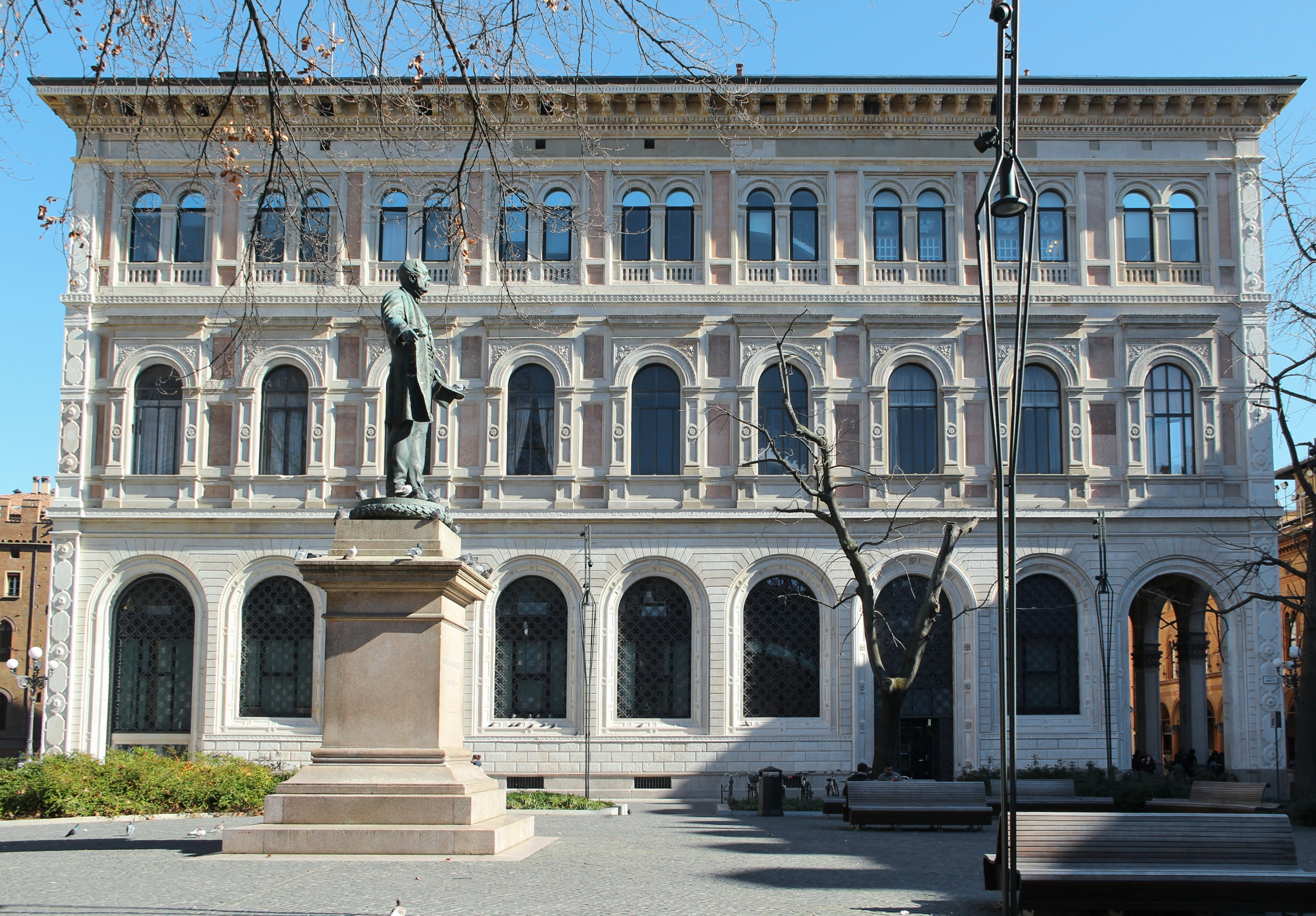
- Head office building, with statue of Marco Minghetti in front
- Trade name: Carisbo
- Company type: subsidiary of a listed company
- Industry: Financial services
- Founded: 1837
- Defunct: 25 February 2019
- Headquarters: Palazzo di Residenza, 22 via Farini, Bologna, Italy
- Key people: Sacchi Morsiani (president)
- Products: Retail banking
- Revenue: ▲€365 million (2013)
- Operating income: ▲€161 million (2013)
- Net income: ▲€259 million (2013)
- Total assets: ▼€9.81 billion (2013)
- Total equity: ▲€1.14 billion (2013)
- Owner: CAER (1992–2000); Cardine Banca (2000–2002); Sanpaolo IMI (2002–2006); Intesa Sanpaolo (2007–)
- Parent: Intesa Sanpaolo
- Website: http://www.carisbo.it

Cassa di Risparmio in Bologna S.p.A. known as Carisbo, was an Italian savings bank founded in 1837 and based in Bologna, Emilia-Romagna. It has been part of Intesa Sanpaolo Group since 2007.

The former owner of the bank, Fondazione Carisbo, still held 2.023% shares of Intesa Sanpaolo as of 31 December 2013.

== History ==
Cassa di Risparmio in Bologna (Carisbo) formally started on 26 September 1837 after the idea of forming a bank emerged 2 years before in Bologna, in the Papal States.

In December 1991, due to Legge Amato, the bank ownership, charity and daily banking operation were separated into a banking foundation (Fondazione Carisbo) and a limited company (Italian: Carisbo società per azioni). Casse Emiliano Romagnole also became a sub-holding company of the bank, which was majority owned by the foundation. In the same year Carisbo acquired BIMER Banca (Banca dell'Emilia-Romagna per i Finanziamenti a Medio e Lungo Termine), which was a merger of Mediocredito Emilia-Romagna and Istituto Regionale di Credito Agrario per l'Emilia-Romagna It was absorbed into Carisbo in 1994. As at 31 December 1993, Carisbo also had a minority interests in Cassa di Risparmio di Mirandola.

In 1997 Carisbo acquired 47% shares of Banca Popolare dell'Adriatico, with CAER also acquired 5%. In 1997 Finemiro, a subsidiary of Carisbo, also transformed into Finemiro Banca. In 1997 Carisbo also sold their shares on Banca di Romagna.

In 2000 CAER Group merged with Casse Venete Banca to form Cardine Banca.

In 2002 Carisbo S.p.A. followed the group merged with Sanpaolo IMI. In 2007 Carisbo SpA followed Sanpaolo IMI to become part of Intesa Sanpaolo Group, which owned 100% shares of the bank.

== Sponsorship ==
Carisbo was the sponsor of Bologna Outdoor, as well as Virtus Pallacanestro Bologna.

== See also ==
- Cassa di Risparmio di Modena, a predecessor of UniCredit
- Cariparma - a short lived sister company (January to February 2007) based in Parma, Emilia-Romagna, a subsidiary of Crédit Agricole
- Cassa di Risparmio di Piacenza e Vigevano, a predecessor of modern Cariparma
- Cassa di Risparmio di Reggio Emilia, a predecessor of UniCredit
- List of banks in Italy
