= Scali family =

Medieval Italian bank

The Scali were one of the three leading Florentine banking families in the Middle Ages. Alongside their competitors (Bardi and Peruzzi), they grew from local cloth traders and deposit bankers to international financiers during the 13th century. By the beginning of the 14th century, the Scalis had become the mightiest commercial house in Italy. In 1326, they abruptly went bankrupt and the company disappeared.

== Rise of the family ==
The Scali or Scala company had been created in the early years of the 13th century and quickly rose to an important position (one member of the family became consul in 1215). They were members the anti-imperial Guelph movement and in 1248 purged their house of its Ghibelline supporters. Their loggia was located close to the Palazzo Bartolini Salimbeni). Even though they were initially involved in textile production and trade, they eventually achieved continental preeminence in the fields of finance and banking.

Like many Italian banks of the time, the Scali specialized in public finance. They lent capital to the kings and princes of Western Europe and often benefited from the farming out of the sovereigns' tax collection. In France for instance, agents of the Scali bank became seneschal of Toulouse and Beaucaire in the 1310s and 1320s. The Scalis were also involved in private finance, in England they counted some of the leading characters of the kingdom as their clients. Tellingly, in 1328, during the trial following the bankruptcy in England, it emerged that the Scalis were in business with no less than four English cardinals. As many other Italian banks, the Scalis were also involved in the finances of the pope.

The Scali bank created a continental network organized in branches and employed agents in the most important centers of Western Europe. Besides Florence, they seem to have been active in Genoa, England, Avignon, Milan, Bordeaux, France and Rome, but it is not impossible that they were active in other locations such as the Flanders and Spain.

== Bankruptcy ==
In July 1326, to honor the visit of the podestat Charles, duke of Calabria, the city borrowed from the Scali and the Amieri companies in excess of 50,000 florins. The city government failed to reimburse in time and both banks collapsed soon after on 4 August 1326. In the chronicles, the bankruptcy of the city's leading bank is regarded as having dearer consequences than the military defeat of Altopascio.

The collapse of the Scali house was also due to other factors. In particular, the Scali had been competing with other Italian houses for one of Europe's most attractive markets: England's wool. By 1326, the sovereign owed the Scali alone some 400,000 florins (the equivalent of England's yearly budget). The fall of the house of Scali led the other Italian debtors of Edward III to abandon their all-out competition for an alliance. These attempts to strengthen their positions failed and less than twenty years later the other two large Italian banks involved with the English crown had gone bankrupt.

In the immediate aftermath of the Scali collapse, all the Florentine bankers suffered from a dramatic loss of trust. In Genoa, three Florentine financiers had to repay enraged clients who had deposited the equivalent of 11,000 florins in the local Scali branch safes. The pope himself stopped using the services of bankers for two years, relying instead on the transport of bullion by land routes.

== Consequences of the collapse ==
The bankruptcy of the Scali was not exceptional; over the whole 13th and 14th centuries a long string of such events kept sending shock waves over the European financial scene. This certainly points to the difficulty bankers of the time faced when trying to safeguard the public's trust in their ability to repay (numerous cases of fraudulent bankruptcy over the period made it all the more difficult). These repeated collapses had a profound impact on the public's perception of the financial world. In Italy they became bywords of the little faith one could put in a foreign sovereign; during the 1940s the Italian fascist cinema even used this theme as a propaganda weapon against the United Kingdom (Re d'Inghilterra non pagà, 1941).

The bankruptcy of the Scali bank was used by Austrian economists to build up their case against the investment of deposited funds by bankers (known as fractional-reserve banking).

After the collapse of the bank, the Scali family remained politically active on the Florentine scene.

== See also ==
- List of banks in Italy
