= Casse Emiliano Romagnole =

Italian holding company and banking group

CAER
- Native name: Gruppo Bancario Casse Emiliano Romagnole S.p.A.
- Company type: private Società per Azioni
- Industry: Financial services
- Founded: 1992
- Defunct: 2000
- Successor: Cardine Banca
- Headquarters: Palazzo di Residenza della Carisbo, Bologna, Italy
Owners
Carisbo Foundation	(72.27%)
Unipol Assicurazioni	(4.55%)
C.R. Carpi Foundation	(1.03%)
other shareholders	(22.15%)
- Parent: Carisbo Foundation
- Subsidiaries: Carisbo; Banca Agricola di Gorizia; Banca Popolare dell'Adriatico; Finemiro Banca

Gruppo Bancario Casse Emiliano Romagnole (CAER) was an Italian holding company and banking group, based in Bologna, Emilia-Romagna. The main company of the group was Cassa di Risparmio in Bologna (Carisbo).

== History ==
Due to Legge Amato, all saving bank (Italian: Cassa di Risparmio) of Italy had to transform into a company limited by shares and a banking foundation. The foundation of Cassa di Risparmio in Bologna (Fondazione Carisbo), formed Casse Emiliano Romagnole (CAER) as their sub-holding company for their own bank (81.08%), as well as participated in the ownership of the saving bank of Carpi (20%), Cento (20%), Faenza (1.51% + 29.96% through Carisbo), Imola (20%), Lugo and Piacenza e Vigevano. CR Lugo was merged with Banca Monte Lugo to form Cassa di Risparmio e Banca del Monte Lugo in August 1992 (which CAER owned 1.32% + 37.4% through Carisbo). Its owner, Fondazione Banca Monte Lugo, was invited to become a shareholders of CAER. In 1993 CR Piacenza was merged with CR Parma to form CR Parma e Piacenza, which its successor was withdrew from the bank group. Additionally, CAER through Carisbo, hold a minority interests in CR Mirandola, CR Ferrara, Credito Romagnolo, Banco S.Geminiano e S.Prospero, and controlling interests in BIMER Banca (ex-Mediocredito Emilia–Romagna) as at 31 December 1993. That year the bank foundation of Carisbo was the major shareholders of the holding, for 93.2%, followed by CR Carpi (2.28%), CR Imola (1.79%), CR Cento (1.61%), CR Lugo (0.55%), BMCR Faenza (0.41%) and Banca Monte Lugo (0.16%). In 1995 CRBM Lugo and CR Faenza merged to form Banca di Romagna, which CAER through direct and indirect ownership, owned 36% shares of the bank.

In 1994 Credito Romagnolo offered to the public to acquire all the shares of CAER by giving the new shares of Credito Romagnolo. However, the bid was not accepted. Credito Romagnolo became part of Credito Italiano in 1995.

=== Alliance with Unipol Assicurazioni ===
In 1995 Unipol Assicurazioni became the new minority shareholders, which acquired 3.64% shares from Fondazione Carisbo. In turn, CAER acquired 9.80% shares of Unipol's parent company, Finsoe, as well as increased the ownership in Banca dell'Economia Cooperativa (from 12% through Carisbo only in 1993 to 19.99% through direct and indirect ownership from 1995 to 1997). Moreover, through Carisbo's subsidiary Fincaer, the group acquired a minority interests in UniSalute (9.9%), Noricum Assicurazioni (34%) in 1995 and Linear Assicurazioni (20%) in 1996. However, CAER did not participated in the capital increases of Unipol Banca in January 1999, as well as selling their shares in UniSalute and Linear Assicurazioni to Unipol in 2001, as Cardine Banca. The shares of Finsoe and in the bank was also disposed in the same year.

=== Expansion and withdrew ===
In 1996 CAER acquired 35.2% shares of Banca Agricola di Gorizia. In 1997, the minority interests of CR Cento (19.35%) and CR Imola (17.48%) were sold back to their bank foundation. The foundations also withdrew as a shareholders of CAER. Foundation Carisbo also acquired the shares from the foundations of Faenza, Lugo and Carpi as well CAER issues new shares to Unipol. After the deals CAER only owned by Foundation Caribso (91.56%), Foundation CR Carpi (1.37%), Foundation CRBM Lugo (0.46%) and Unipol (6.61%) in January 1998. In 1997 through Carisbo (47.08%) and direct ownership 5%, Banca Popolare dell'Adriatico was acquired (52.08%), but Banca di Romagna was sold.

=== In the wake of merger ===
In 1999 CAER issued new shares for the minority owners of Caribso, which the company became a wholly owned subsidiary of CAER. After the deal Foundation Carisbo owned 72.27% shares, Foundation CR Carpi owned 1.03%, Unipol owned 4.55% and the rest were owned by private citizens; Foundation CRBM Lugo also sold their shares.

As at 31 December 1999, CAER was the direct holding company :

- as subsidiary
  - Cassa di Risparmio in Bologna (Carisbo)
  - Banca Agricola di Gorizia
  - Banca Popolare dell'Adriatico
  - Finemiro Banca
  - CAER Leasing
  - CAER Servizi
  - CAER Ireland
  - Caerfid
  - CAER Suisse
- minority ownership
  - Cassa di Risparmio di Carpi (17.32%)
  - Finsoe (9.82%)
  - Unipol Banca (8.00%)
  - La Compagnia Finanziaria (13.30%)
  - Sanpaolo IMI (0.14%)
  - Beni Stabili

On 1 February 2000 CAER merged with Casse Venete Banca to form Cardine Banca.

== See also ==
- List of banks in Italy
