= Cassa di Risparmio del Veneto =

- Trade name: CR Veneto
- Formerly: Cassa di Risparmio di Padova e Rovigo
- Company type: subsidiary
- Industry: Financial services
- Predecessor: Cassa di Risparmio di Padova; Cassa di Risparmio di Rovigo
- Founded: 1822 in Padua; 1928 (merged with CR Rovigo); 1992 (as a S.p.A.)
- Defunct: 2018
- Fate: absorbed by Intesa Sanpaolo
- Successor: Fondazione Cariparo; (charity and ownership of the bank)
- Headquarters: Padua, Italy
- Number of locations: ▼302 branches (2016)
- Area served: Venteo region
Key people
Gilberto Muraro	(chairman)
Renzo Simonato	(general manager)
- Services: retail banking; corporate banking
- Net income: ▼€21 million (2016)
- Total assets: ▲€16.694 billion (2016)
- Total equity: ▲€1.311 billion (2016)
- Owner: Intesa Sanpaolo (100%)
- Number of employees: ▼3,354 (2016)
- Parent: Intesa Sanpaolo
- Capital ratio: ▲20.66% (CET1)
- Rating: N/A (Moody's) (Note: The bank became a wholly owned subsidiary of Sanpaolo IMI since 2004, and did not issue separate financial products, thus no separate rating.)
- Website: www.crveneto.it
- Footnotes / references source: 2016 Report for the situation at 31 December 2016

Cassa di Risparmio del Veneto S.p.A., known as CR Veneto, was an Italian savings bank, headquartered in Padua, Veneto (Italian: Padova). It was a subsidiary of Intesa Sanpaolo.

== History ==
The bank was one of the oldest savings bank of Italy, which in 1822 the government of Kingdom of Lombardy–Venetia introduced savings bank to Venice, Padua, Rovigo and other provincial capitals (such as Vicenza and Treviso). In 1928 the savings banks of Padua and Rovigo was merged to form Cassa di Risparmio di Padova e Rovigo (Cariparo), due to a law enacted in December 1927 (converted a decree-law published in March 1927 into law). Before the enactment, Federazione delle Casse di Risparmio di Padova e Rovigo was formed circa March 1927.

In 1992, due to Legge Amato, the bank was split into Fondazione Cariparo and Cassa di Risparmio di Padova e Rovigo S.p.A..

=== Casse Venete Banca ===
As opposed to the Savings Bank of Verona, Vicenza, Belluno and Ancona being merged with Treviso to form Unicredito, the owner of the Savings Bank of Padova & Rovigo, Venice, Gorizia, Udine & Pordenone and Banca Agricola di Cerea formed a single holding company Casse Venete Banca, although the subsidiaries still operated as separate entity, in 1994.

=== Cardine Banca ===
In 2000, Cariparo followed the parent company to merge with Casse Emiliano Romagnole Group to form Cardine Banca Group.

=== Sanpaolo IMI and Intesa Sanpaolo ===
In 2002, The Savings Bank of Padova & Rovigo followed the parent banking group to merge with Sanpaolo IMI. Banca Agricola di Cerea was absorbed into The Savings Bank of Padova & Rovigo on 1 June 2003.

On 2 January 2007, The Savings Bank of Padova & Rovigo became part of Intesa Sanpaolo Group after another merger. On 25 September 2008 the bank renamed to Cassa di Risparmio del Veneto. Followed the closure of the Savings Bank of Venice, the Savings Bank of Veneto was the only oldest surviving Cassa di Risparmio of Italy, which other banks had either dropped Cassa di Risparmio in their name or ceased to be exist due to merger. However, in February 2018, Intesa Sanpaolo announced the 2018–2021 business plan, which would closed down most of their retail brands including Cassa di Risparmio del Veneto. Cassa di Risparmio del Veneto would cease to exist as a separate legal entity, becoming divisions and branches of the banking group instead.

== See also ==
- List of banks in Italy
