= Banca Popolare di Venezia =

Acquired Italian cooperative bank by Banca Popolare di Vicenza

Banca Popolare di Venezia was an Italian cooperative bank which was acquired in 1994 by the Banca Popolare di Vicenza.
