= Sanpaolo IMI =

Defunct Italian banking and insurance conglomerate (1998–2007)

- Type: Public
- Industry: Bank, Insurance
- Predecessor: Istituto Bancario San Paolo di Torino; Istituto Mobiliare Italiano
- Founded: 1998 (Sanpaolo IMI)
- Defunct: 2007
- Fate: merged with Banca Intesa
- Successor: Intesa Sanpaolo
- Headquarters: Turin, Italy
- Key people: Alfonso Iozzo, CEO; Enrico Salza, Chairman
- Revenue: € 9.726 bn (2004)
- Number of employees: 44,000 (2006)
- Website: Gruppo Sanpaolo IMI

Sanpaolo IMI S.p.A. was an Italian banking and insurance conglomerate, based in Turin. It employed about 44,000 people and had about 7 million customers.

On 24 August 2006, a merger with Banca Intesa was announced, which on 1 December 2006 was approved by the joint meetings of the shareholders of Banca Intesa and Sanpaolo IMI. On 2 January 2007, the merger went into effect, thereby creating Intesa Sanpaolo, now the largest Italian bank and one of the largest in the Eurozone.

The new banking company is based in Turin and is administered under the "two-tier model", with the presence of a Supervisory Board and a Board of Management. This was the first application of this model in a major Italian company.

== History ==
Sanpaolo IMI was formed by many mergers of banks, which in 1998 Istituto Bancario San Paolo di Torino merged with Istituto Mobiliare Italiano.

In 2002, the group absorbed Cardine Banca, a short-lived holding company that consisted of Cassa di Risparmio in Bologna, Cassa di Risparmio di Padova e Rovigo, Cassa di Risparmio di Venezia, Cassa di Risparmio di Udine e Pordenone, Cassa di Risparmio di Gorizia and Banca Popolare dell'Adriatico.

== Activities ==
Sanpaolo IMI had about 3,200 local offices where private, business and retail banking activities take place. It also managed savings and retirement funds.

== Management ==
The last honorary president was Luigi Arcuti. The last president was Enrico Salza, the last managing director was Alfonso Iozzo, the last general manager was Pietro Modiano.

== Subsidiaries ==
Before the merger, the following banks were the subsidiaries of the group:

- Banca dell'Adriatico
- Cassa di Risparmio del Veneto
- Cassa di Risparmio di Venezia
- Cassa di Risparmio in Bologna
- Cassa dei Risparmi di Forlì e della Romagna
- Neos Finance
- Banco di Napoli
- Banca IMI
- Friulcassa

== Ownership ==
- Total shares: 1,875,087,936
  - Total ordinary shares: 1,590,903,918
  - Total preferred shares:284,184,018
- par value: €2.88 each.

Before the merger, on 31 December 2006, the shareholders were (ordinary and preference shares):

1. Compagnia di San Paolo 14.19%
2. Fondazione Cariparo 7.02%
3. Fondazione Carisbo 5.54%
4. Giovanni Agnelli e C. 4.96%
5. Banco Santander 3.63%
6. Carlo Tassara 2.51%
7. Assicurazioni Generali 2.47%

ownership ratio below 2% was not required to disclose ownership to CONSOB, based on other sources, know institution owners were :

- Fondazione di Venezia 1.47%
- Ente Cassa di Risparmio di Firenze 1.11%
- Fondazione Monte dei Paschi di Siena 0.84%

== See also ==
- List of banks in Italy
