= Istituto Bancario San Paolo di Torino =

Defunct Italian bank

- Company type: private
- Industry: Financial services
- Founded: 1563
- Defunct: 1998
- Successor: Sanpaolo IMI
- Headquarters: Turin, Italy
- Services: retail banking; corporate banking
- Owner: Compagnia di San Paolo

Istituto Bancario San Paolo di Torino S.p.A., commonly known as just San Paolo, was an Italian bank. It was headquartered in Turin, Piedmont. The bank is the predecessor of Sanpaolo IMI, as well as the current largest bank in Italy in terms of total assets, Intesa Sanpaolo. The former owner of San Paolo bank, Compagnia di San Paolo, still significantly owned Intesa Sanpaolo. In 1998 the bank merged with Istituto Mobiliare Italiano to form Sanpaolo IMI.

== History ==
The bank was founded by Compagnia di San Paolo (a brotherhood) in 1563. In early years the bank was a mount of piety. By the late 19th-century, it was state-controlled.

In 1991 Crediop became a subsidiary of the bank, which was sold to Dexia in 1999 by Sanpaolo IMI, the successor of the bank.

In 1991, due to Legge Amato, the bank was transformed from a statutory corporation to a società per azioni (company limited by shares), which San Paolo Bank Holding S.p.A. and Istituto Bancario San Paolo di Torino S.p.A. were created. Compagnia di San Paolo remained as the major shareholders. In 1997 the brotherhood owned 20.54% of the bank, followed by Banco Santander (6.8%), Istituto Mobiliare Italiano (5%) and others.

In 1994 the bank absorbed Banca Provinciale Lombarda and Banco Lariano. In 1995 Sanpaolo absorbed Banca Nazionale delle Comunicazioni.

According to Ricerche e Studi, a subsidiary of Mediobanca, the bank was ranked second in terms of client deposits in 1997, behind Banca Intesa (pro forma data). In 1998 the bank merged with Istituto Mobiliare Italiano to form Sanpaolo IMI.

Former shareholders of Sanpaolo received about 55.3% shares of the new company (or 775,184,948). Compagnia di San Paolo would own 16.4%.

== See also ==
- List of banks in Italy
