= Palazzo di Residenza della Cassa di Risparmio in Bologna =

Coordinates: 44.4917°N 11.3453°E

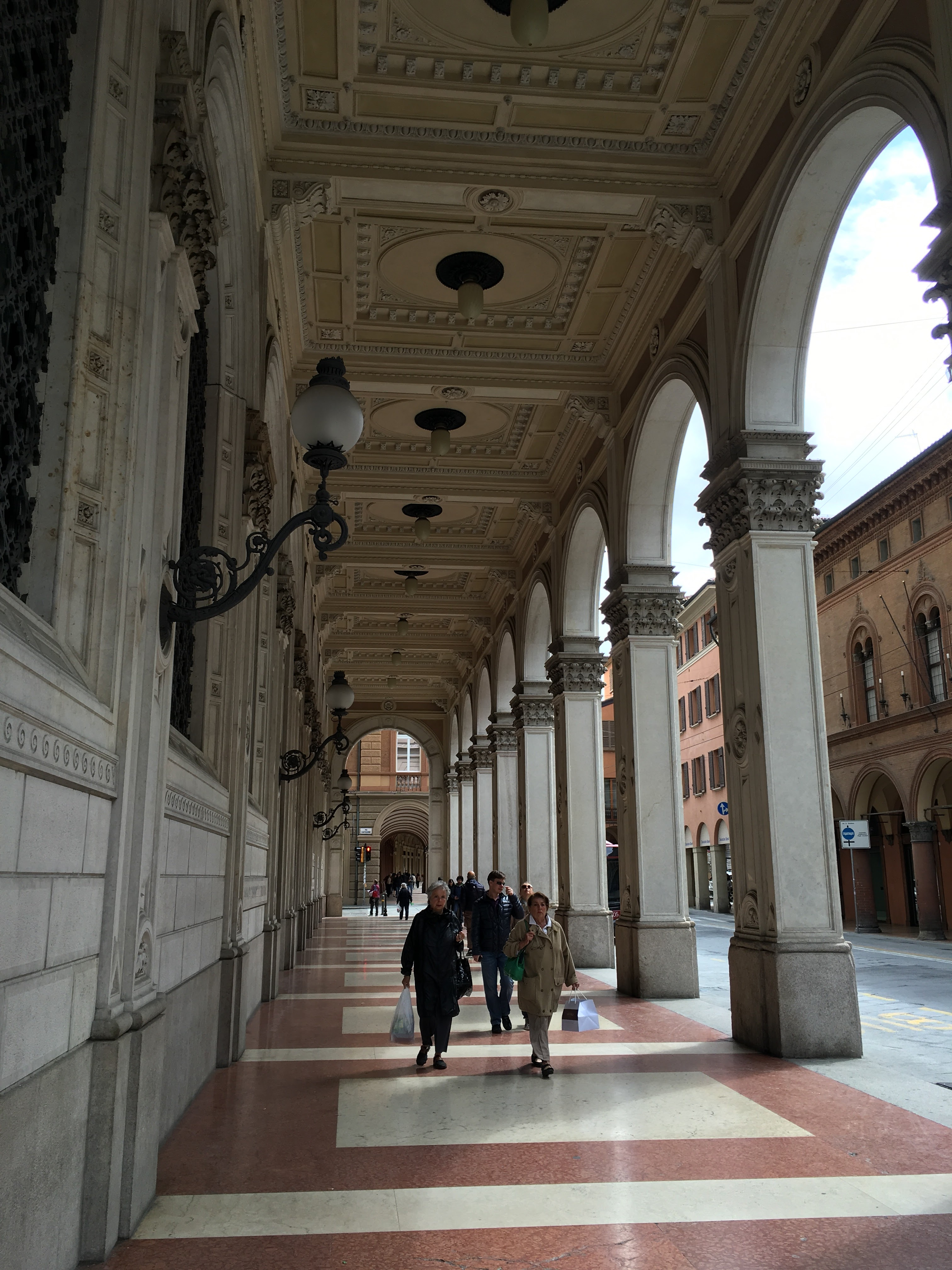
- Front of building of the Savings Bank of Bologna
- Interactive map of the Palazzo di Residenza della Cassa di Risparmio in Bologna area

General information
- Architectural style: Palace
- Location: Bologna, Italy

The Palazzo di Residenza della Cassa di Risparmio di Bologna is a 19th-century palace, erected as Neo-Renaissance architecture, located on Via Farini #22, Bologna, region of Emilia-Romagna, Italy. It was built and is still the headquarter of the Cassa di Risparmio in Bologna.

== History ==
The palace was commissioned from the architect Giuseppe Mengoni. Built from 1868-1873 in an eclectic style; the building has undergone several reconstructions. The central courtyard was covered in 1955 - 1956 to create a large open inner lobby.

The scenic staircase is decorated with marble ornamentation by Marzocchi, Vespignani and Galassi. The cast iron banisters were designed by Davide Venturoli and the marble vases by Ferdinando Amadori. Other artists involved in this decoration include Giuseppe Romagnoli and Bruno Boari.

An assembly hall, the Sala dei Cento, has fresco decoration by Luigi Samoggia and speckled dark walnut furniture by engraver Carlo Fraboni. The interior has canvases in the collection of the foundation by Nicola Bertuzzi, Carlo Lodi, Antonio Beccadelli, Pietro Roppa, Bernardo Minozzi, Ercole Drei, Lorenzo Pasinelli, Giovanni Romagnoli, Guercino, Giuseppe Maria Crespi, Annibale Carracci, Donato Creti, Antonio Basoli, Pietro Poppi and Pelagio Palagi.
