= Antonio Beccadelli (painter) =

Italian painter (1718–1803)

Antonio Beccadelli (1718 – 20 February 1803) was an Italian painter of the late-Baroque or Rococo style. He painted mainly Genre subjects in a fashion after Giuseppe Maria Crespi.

He was born and died in Bologna, where he was a pupil of Felice Torelli, and he may also have studied with Giuseppe Carlo Pedretti. Beccadelli's documented work consists of two commissions (1763) executed for the Boschi family in Bologna, depicting Charity of the Capuchin Brothers, Interior with Table, and the Country Dance, in which the landscapes were completed by Carlo Lodi. In 1763–4 Beccadelli painted the figures in five decorative overdoors representing landscapes, again in collaboration with Lodi, for the Villa Boschi, Bologna.

In 1745 he became a member of the Accademia Clementina, and became its principe in 1757. Late in life, he served on commissions investigating works of art looted during the Napoleonic occupation of the city. He became an art merchant late in life.

== Sources ==
- "Antonio Beccadelli", In: Art Encyclopedia, Grove Art, Oxford University Press
