= Cardine Banca =

Former Italian bank

- Native name: Cardine Banca S.p.A.
- Type: private Società per Azioni
- Industry: Financial services
- Predecessor: Casse Emiliano Romagnole; Casse Venete Banca
- Founded: 2000
- Defunct: 2002
- Fate: Acquired by Sanpaolo IMI
- Headquarters: Palazzo di Residenza, 22 via Farini, Bologna, Italy
- Net income: ▼€185.473 million (2001)
- Total assets: ▲€43.062 billion (2001)
- Total equity: ▲€3.502 billion (2001)
- Footnotes in consolidated basis

Cardine Banca S.p.A. was an Italian banking group that operated between 2000 and 2002. It was acquired by Sanpaolo IMI, a banking and insurance conglomerate.

== History ==
The bank was founded in 2000 by the merger of Casse Emiliano Romagnole and Casse Venete Banca. On 1 June 2002 the group was acquired by Sanpaolo IMI in an all shares deal.

In 2000 Banca Agricola di Gorizia was sold to Banca Popolare di Cividale.

In 2002, the European Investment Bank advanced a €200.37 million loan to the banking group, as part of a subsidized loan to small and medium-sized enterprises and small and medium-sized infrastructure projects.

== Subsidiaries ==
- product company
  - Cardine Leasing
  - Finemiro Leasing
  - Cardine Fiduciaria
- retail banks
  - Banca Agricola di Cerea
  - Banca Popolare dell'Adriatico
  - Cassa di Risparmio di Gorizia
  - Cassa di Risparmio di Padova e Rovigo (Cariparo)
  - Cassa di Risparmio di Udine e Pordenone (CRUP)
  - Cassa di Risparmio di Venezia
  - Cassa di Risparmio in Bologna (Carisbo)
  - Finemiro Banca
  - FarBanca
  - West Bank S.A.

== See also ==
- List of banks in Italy
