= Corruption in Italy =

Corruption in Italy is a major problem. In Transparency International's annual surveys, Italy has consistently been regarded as one of the most corrupt countries in the Eurozone. Political corruption remains a major problem, particularly in Lombardy, Campania, and Sicily, where corruption perception is at a high level. Political parties are ranked the most corrupt institution in Italy, closely followed by public officials and Parliament, according to Transparency International. But in the 2013 Global Corruption Barometer report, Italy is in 17th position in front of the United Kingdom (18th), Switzerland (21st) and the United States (22nd).

Regarding business and corruption, foreign investments and economic growth are hindered by organized crime and corruption. Business executives from the World Economic Forum Global Competitiveness Report 2013–2014 consider corruption one of the problems for doing business in Italy. The procurement process, mainly in water, roads and railway projects, in Italy is affected by corruption.

According to Transparency International's Global Corruption Barometer 2013, 89% of surveyed households consider political parties to be corrupt or extremely corrupt—ranking as the most corrupt institution in Italy. Furthermore, 64% of the surveyed households believe that the level of corruption has increased and 61% of surveyed households find government efforts in the fight against corruption to be ineffective

Italian culture has been described as being characterized by "an ambiguous attitude to graft". A 2015 Al Jazeera report noted that clientelism and graft have long been cornerstones of the country's political establishment, and a Forbes contributor wrote in 2016 about "the deep-seated nature of unsavoury elements in both private and public sectors" in Italy. "Many Italians", maintained a 2010 report, have accepted corruption and poor governance as part of their lives. However, a 2015 report challenged this generally accepted view, arguing that "corruption in Italy does not seem to be a cultural issue" and that Italians consistently believe corrupt practices are less acceptable than other European nations.

The Mafia plays a key role in both public and private corruption. Arising "out of business deals", as Forbes put it, the Mafia historically "acted as a guarantor for contracts, when the judiciary was viewed as weak. Until relatively recent history, almost every deal in the country was enforced by a 'man of honor.'"

One source has described the web of corruption involving politics, business, and the Mafia as "an unholy triangle," adding that it could alternatively be seen as a rectangle, with the Catholic Church being a fourth major participant in the web of corruption, owing to links between the Mafia and Vatican Bank and to "complex money laundering systems" involving banks that manage church funds.

== Recent history ==
=== L'Aquila earthquake ===
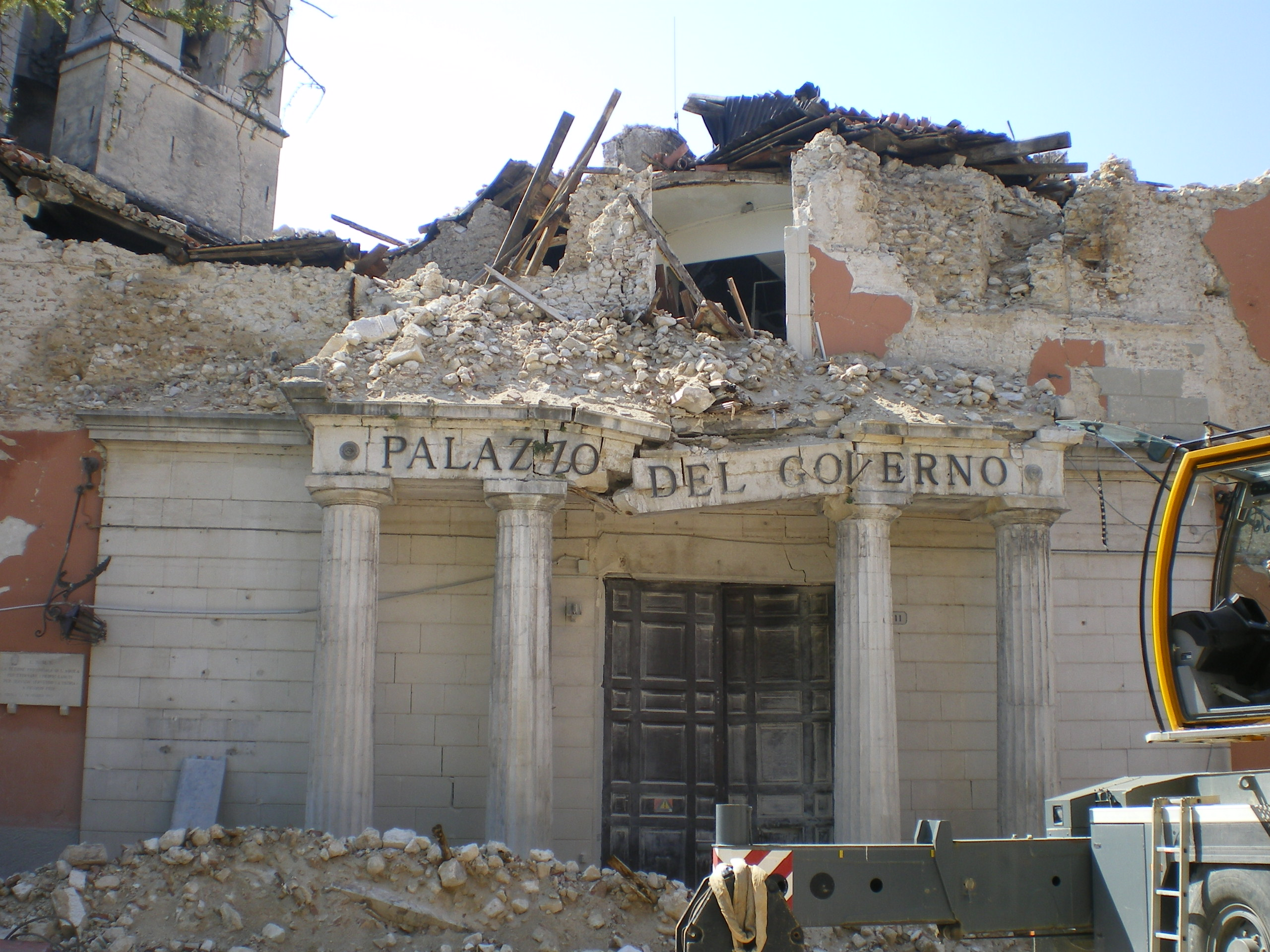
2009 L'Aquila earthquake

After a 1968 earthquake in Sicily, most of the funds appropriated to replace housing went to "needless construction projects," a fact that underscored the scale of Italian corruption and the influence of the Mafia. Similarly, the 2009 L'Aquila earthquake, in which over 300 people died, was described as a "stark reminder to Italians of the risks they take by tolerating a corrupt political system." Franco Barberi, head of an Italian committee assessing earthquake risks, alleged that anywhere where corruption had not undermined safety measures, a similar earthquake would have resulted in no fatalities.

=== Tangentopoli ===
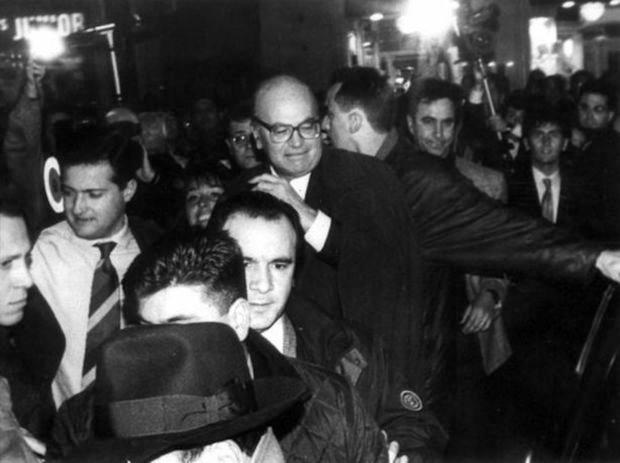
Former Prime Minister Bettino Craxi greeted by a salvo of coins as a sign of loathing by protesters in Rome on 30 April 1993 during the Mani pulite investigation

A 1992–1994 corruption scandal called Tangentopoli ("Bribe City"), uncovered by the so-called Mani pulite ("Clean hands") investigation, "rocked Italy to its core" and brought down the First Republic. But the probes "fizzled out" and the bribery just got worse.

The political impact of Mani Pulite remains the worst scandal of all modern Italy. The public outrage over the corruption led to "the sudden extinction" of five different political factions that had controlled Italy's government since 1946. A new political establishment took their place, but corruption resumed.

One target of the 1992 through 1994 corruption probes was Gianstefano Frigerio, then a Christian Democrat MP. During 1992–1994, he was the defendant in four trials; one case fell afoul of the statute of limitations, but in the remaining three cases he was found guilty. He managed to have his six-year prison sentence reduced, then turned into a community service sentence, wherein his public service in the Parliament had been deemed acceptable community service. He was then re-elected to parliament in 2001, and arrested again in 2014 for participation in the massive corruption scheme surrounding the Expo in Milan.

It is widely believed that two judges, Paolo Borsellino and Giovanni Falcone, were murdered in 1992 because of their efforts to punish corrupt ties between the Mafia and politicians.

== Perceptions ==
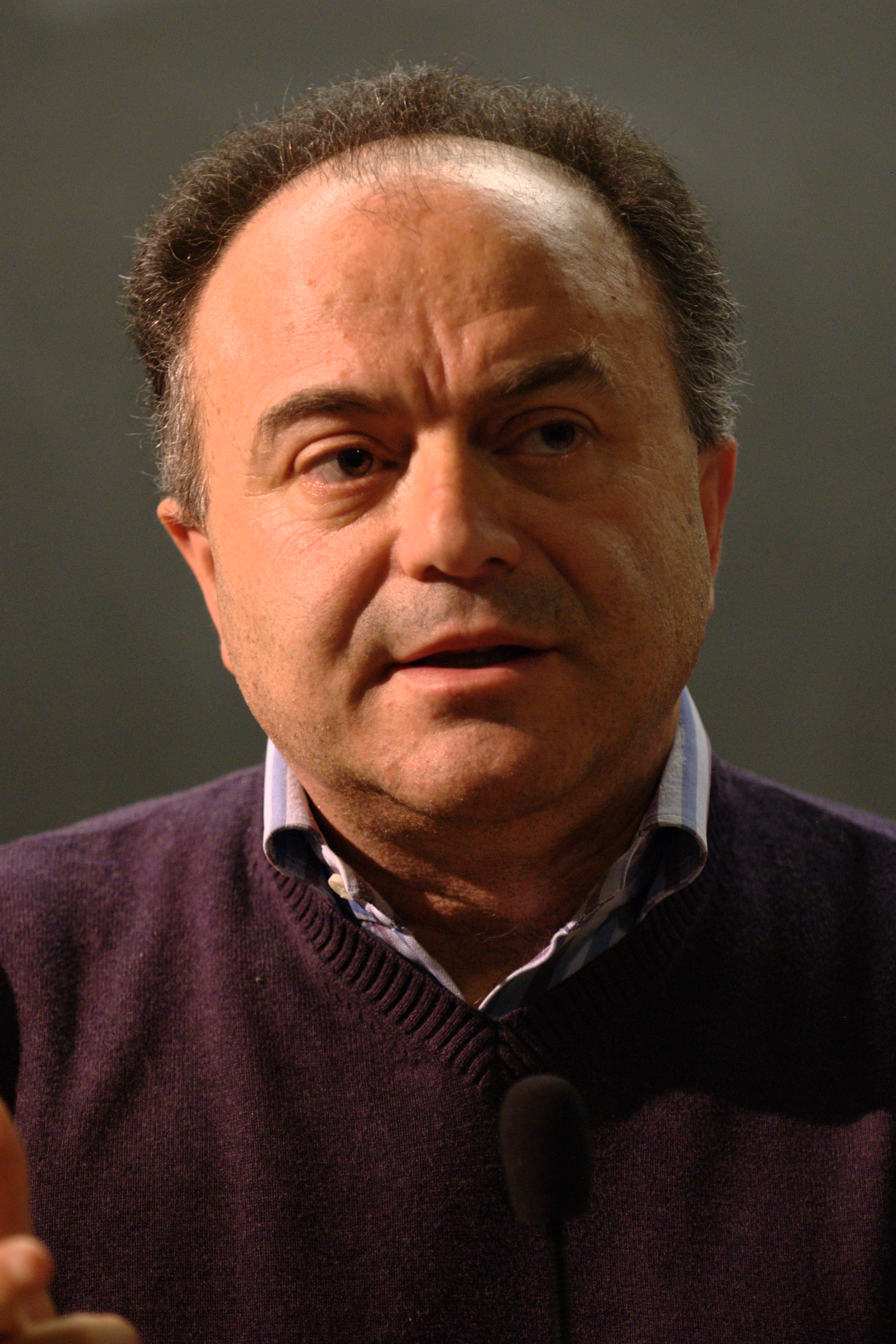
Nicola Gratteri

On Transparency International's 2025 Corruption Perceptions Index Italy scored 53 on a scale from 0 ("highly corrupt") to 100 ("very clean"). When ranked by score, Italy ranked 52nd among the 182 countries in the Index, where the country ranked first is perceived to have the most honest public sector. For comparison with regional scores, the best score among Western European and European Union countries (Note: Austria, Belgium, Bulgaria, Croatia, Cyprus, Czechia, Denmark, Estonia, Finland, France, Germany, Greece, Hungary, Iceland, Ireland, Italy, Latvia, Lithuania, Luxembourg, Malta, Netherlands, Norway, Poland, Portugal, Romania, Slovakia, Slovenia, Spain, Sweden, Switzerland, and the United Kingdom.) was 89, the average score was 64 and the worst score was 40. For comparison with worldwide scores, the best score was 89 (ranked 1), the average score was 42, and the worst score was 9 (ranked 181, in a two-way tie).

In 2012, 65% of Italians told Transparency International that they thought corruption had intensified during the previous three years. In April 2016, Italian Court of Cassation judge Piercamillo Davigo, who had prosecuted widespread political corruption in the 1990s, also expressed the view that corruption had grown worse since then. "The politicians haven't stopped stealing, they've stopped being ashamed of it," he said. "Now they blatantly claim a right to do what they used to do secretly."

Nicola Gratteri, an anti-mafia prosecutor, shared Davigo's view that the level of political corruption had heightened. Gratteri noted that twenty years prior, it was common practice for mob bosses to ask politicians for favors, but in recent years the politicians have sought the aid of mob bosses in return for public contracts.

A 2013 report in The Guardian identified "organised crime and corruption" as one of six problems currently facing Italy. The Mafia, once confined largely to the south, now operated nationwide and had spread beyond drug trafficking and prostitution to transport, public health, and other industries.

Since 2000, Italy has experienced perceived corruption levels on par with post-Soviet, Eastern European transition nations.

== Government ==
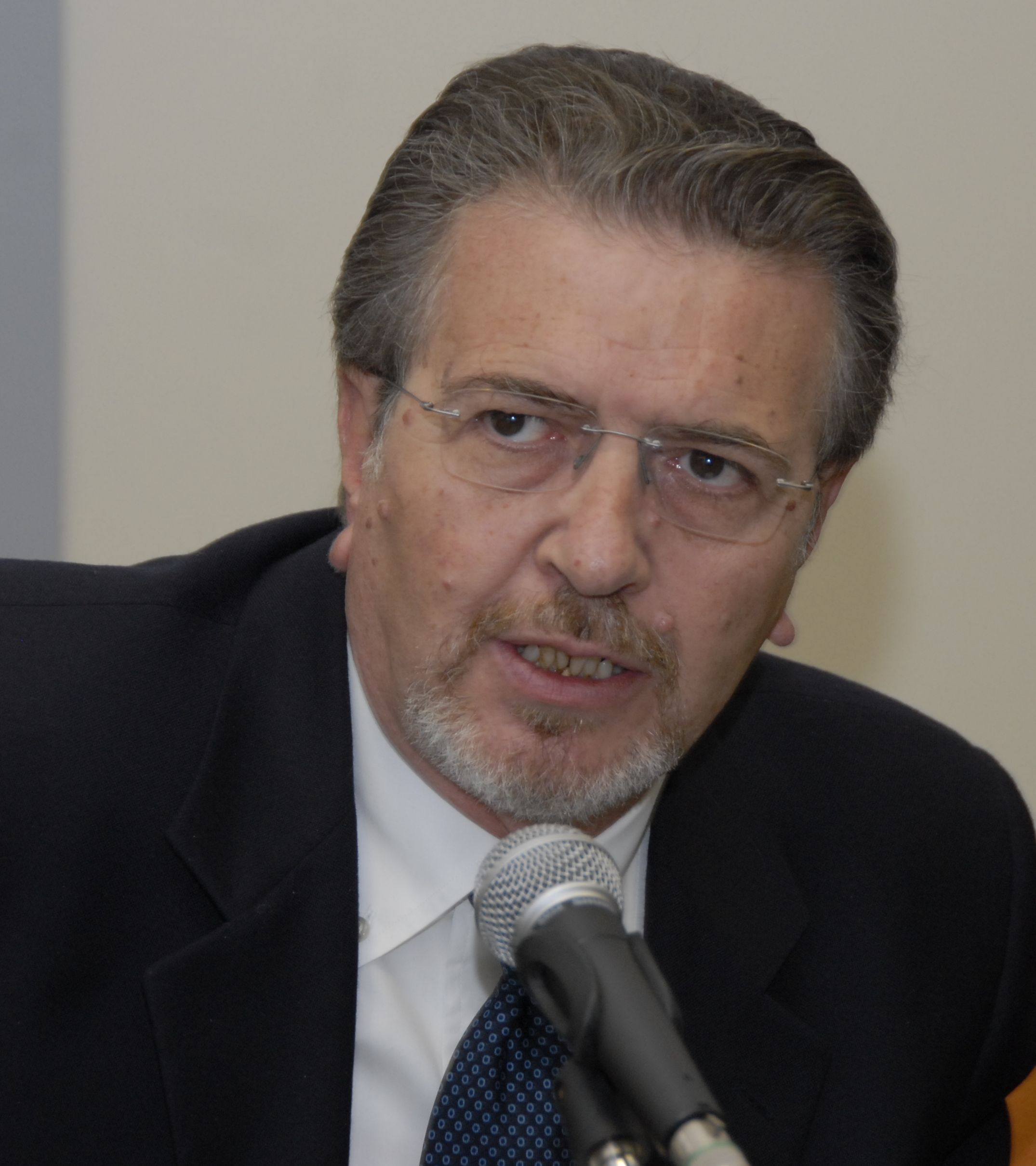
Filippo Penati

Italian public officials routinely have close ties to organized crime and to businesses. Italian citizens consider political parties and parliament itself to be the nation's two most corrupt institutions.

Corruption is common in Italy's public services sector. Doing business in Italy is complicated by inefficient government bureaucracies and burdensome rules, and almost half of Italians believe that the issuance of business permits involves bribes and abuse of power. Because of corruption, it takes almost six years to complete a major public works project in Italy, and such projects cost four times as much as elsewhere in Europe.

On 3 May 1999, the Italian Parliament passed a bill that for the first time gave to the public administrations the faculty of recruiting their human resources through a competitive examination (Italian: concorso per soli titoli) exclusively based on the previous background of the candidates in terms of academic titles and working CVs, without the provision of any written nor oral test.

In 2002, the Berlusconi government "virtually abolished the crime of false accounting", a move that caused a growth in corruption and Mafia crime.

As of 2012, Filippo Penati, a PD politician, was being investigated for corruption, specifically bribery. So was PdL party member Marco Mario Milanese, whose fellow party members in parliament managed to prevent his arrest.

Industry Minister Federica Guidi resigned in March 2016 when evidence emerged that she sought to help her boyfriend's business by helping to pass a certain budget amendment. Her boyfriend, Gianluca Gemelli, faced charges of corruption and influence peddling in the so-called Basilicata case.

In July 2024, Italian lawmakers voted to decriminalize the crime of abuse of office. Critics of the new legislation have said that citizens reporting public corruption will no longer be protected by the law.

=== Silvio Berlusconi ===
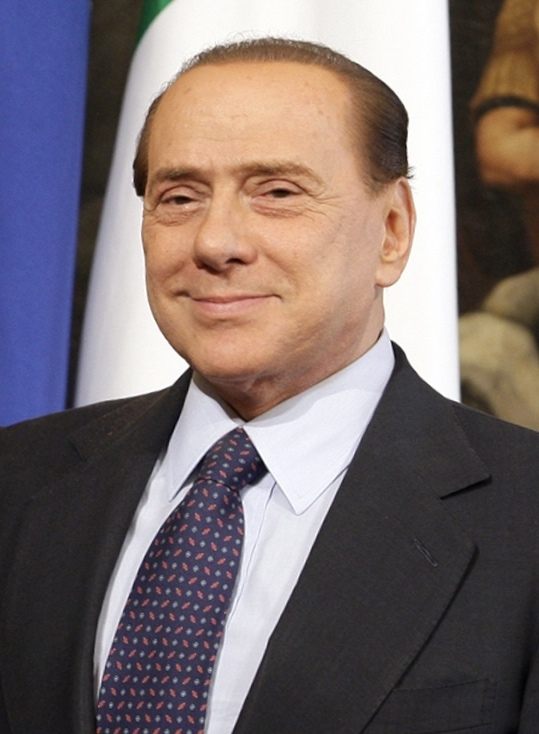
Silvio Berlusconi

Silvio Berlusconi (1936–2023), billionaire, media mogul, and prime minister of Italy for three periods (1994–1995, 2001–2006, and 2008–2011), was frequently accused of corruption. His firms have been charged with such crimes as bribery and false invoicing, and Berlusconi himself has widely been rumored to have had Mafia ties. In 2011, the U.S. State Department named Berlusconi as participating in the "commercial sexual exploitation of a Moroccan child".

Convicted of tax fraud in 2012, he was removed from the Italian Senate after the Supreme Court confirmed the verdict the next year, but not imprisoned. In June 2013 he was found guilty of paying a teenage girl for sex, and of abusing his political power, but the verdict was overturned in 2014.

=== Public procurement ===
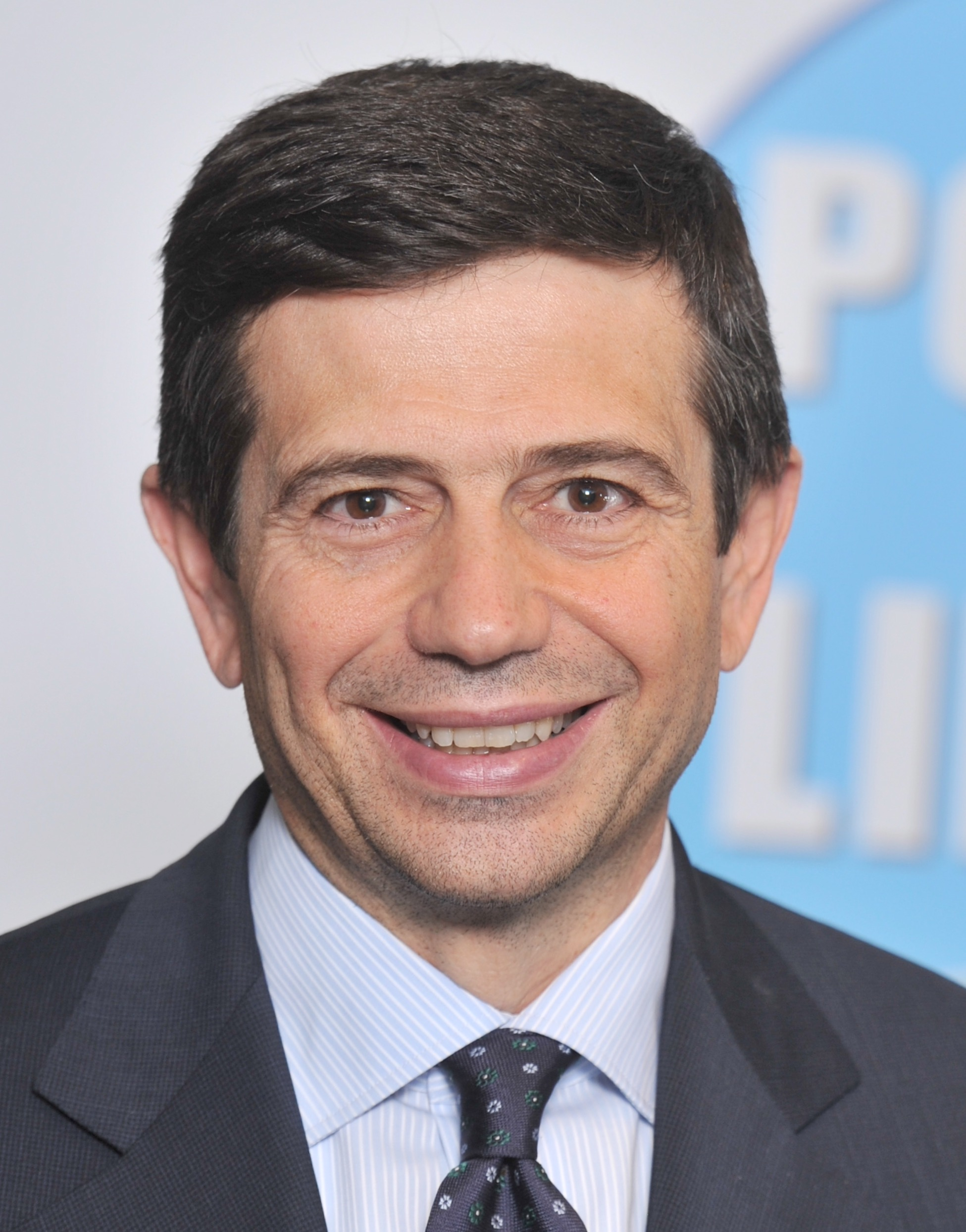
Maurizio Lupi

The government procurement system is characterized by a high level of corruption. This is particularly true where infrastructure contracts are concerned. In such cases, the Mafia is very likely to be involved and favoritism will almost inevitably play a part in the awarding of contracts. In recent years, most of the high-profile corruption cases in Italy have involved government procurement. In 2015, one in three public contracts involved irregularities.

Contracts for Expo 2015, a fair in Milan, became the subject of a major anti-corruption investigation in which seven officials were arrested as of April 2015. Venice's mayor and over 30 other public officials were arrested in 2015 for accepting bribes in exchange for building contracts. In the same year, several businessmen were taken into custody on charges of belonging to "a gang involved in kickbacks and dodgy contracts" for high-speed rail lines, Expo 2015, a flood barrier in Venice, and other large-scale projects. Among those who had received kickbacks was Infrastructure and Transport Minister Maurizio Lupi, who was forced to resign.

Data from the he Italian government’s Antimafia Investigative Directorate (DIA), shows that 38% of all the anti-mafia measures taken in Italy in 2024 were related to the construction sector, when about 200 public works sites were investigated for suspected infiltration by organised crime.

=== Judiciary ===
The Italian courts are slow and inefficient. Almost half of citizens surveyed view the system as corrupt, and many think that bribes and abuse of power are common.

=== Police ===
Experts view the Italian police as being relatively free of corruption and respectful of the law. About a third of Italians, however, consider the police to be corrupt.

=== Land administration ===
There is a degree of corruption in Italian land administration. Over half of citizens think that officials issuing building permits commit bribery and abuse of power.

=== Tax system ===
The tax system lacks transparency and involves considerable bribery. Most firms view the tax rates as problematic.

=== Customs service ===
There is a degree of corruption in the customs system.

== Financial sector ==
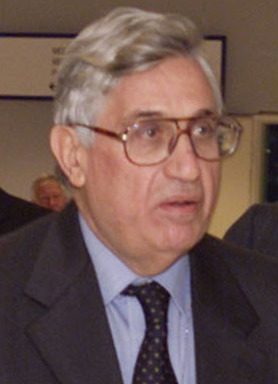
Antonio Fazio

The Bancopoli scandal of 2005–2006 involved stock manipulation and insider trading. Antonio Fazio, head of Italy's central bank, gave an unfair advantage to Banca Popolare Italiana (BPI) in its struggle against the Dutch bank ABN AMRO for control of Banca Antonveneta. Fazio and other figures in the banking community were ultimately forced to resign, while the managing director of BPI was arrested and the bank's entire board of directors came under investigation.

Fazio was forced to resign and BPI Managing Director, Gianpiero Fiorani, was arrested on several charges in connection with the attempted takeover, having been accused of using illegal procedures. Giovanni Consorte, head of the Italian insurance company Unipol, was also forced to resign due to implications that he was connected with the Antonveneta scheme and another attempted takeover of the Italian Banca Nazionale del Lavoro (BNL). Ultimately, ABN AMRO gained control of Antonveneta and the French BNP Paribas attained control of BNL.

== Sports ==
In 2006, police investigators revealed that the managers of major Italian football clubs had been colluding with friendly referees to rig games. This sports scandal, called Calciopoli (Italian pronunciation: [kalˈtʃɔːpoli]), involved the top professional association football league Serie A and to a lesser extent Serie B. Involving various clubs and numerous executives, both from the same clubs and from the main Italian football bodies (Italian Referee Association (AIA) FIGC, and LNP), as well as some referees and referee assistants, the scandal was uncovered in May 2006, when several telephone tappings showed relations between clubs' executives and referee organizations during the football seasons of 2004–05 and 2005–06, being accused of selecting favourable referees. This implicated league champions Juventus and several other clubs, including Fiorentina, Lazio, AC Milan, and Reggina. In July 2006, Juventus was stripped of the 2004–05 Serie A title, which was left unassigned, and was downgraded to last place in the 2005–06 Serie A, as the title was subsequently awarded to Inter Milan, and relegated to Serie B.

== Rome ==
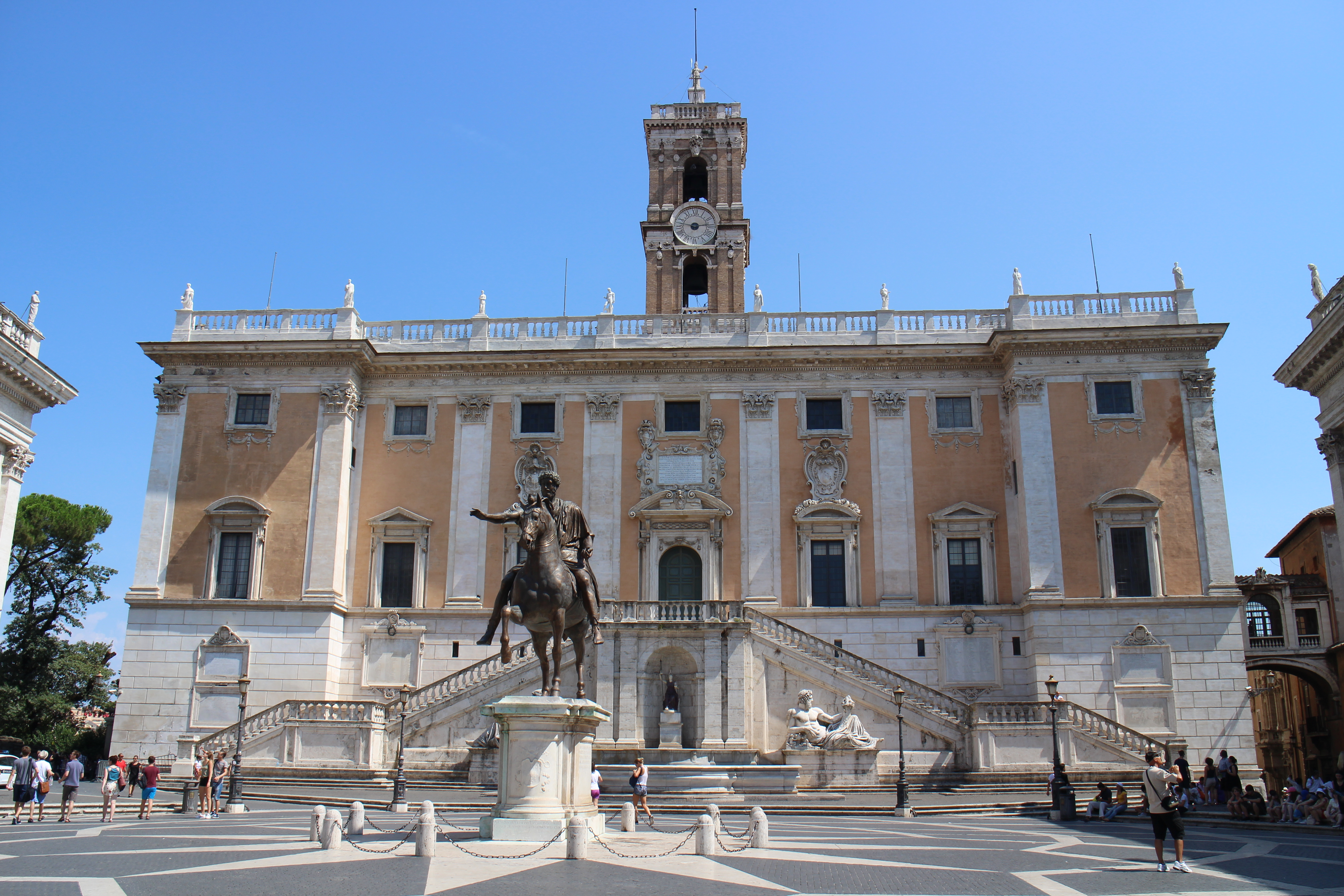
Palazzo Senatorio, seat of the municipality of Rome. It has been a town hall since AD 1144, making it the oldest town hall in the world.

Beginning in December 2014, ties between Roman politicians and the Mafia were made public by the municipal judiciary, which provided evidence of the widespread siphoning of public funds from projects involving "the managing of green areas, recycling, social housing and refugee reception centers". Leading officials were shown to have received bribes in exchange for government contracts; former mayor Gianni Alemanno was among those investigated.

In what has come to be called the Mafia Capitale investigation, officials were accused of rigging contracts for the management of migrant centers in Rome. The scheme involved stealing millions of euros from the civic coffers. The city has continued to suffer because of this crime. In mid-2015, several leading government and business figures were arrested in connection with the scandal.

A June 2016 report in The Guardian noted that Rome mayoral candidate Virginia Raggi of the Five Star Movement (M5S) was doing well in polls because of her focus on "the corruption and cronyism of Italy's mainstream parties." In Rome, noted the newspaper, "establishment politicians and officials" were currently "on trial alongside alleged mobsters, charged with conspiring to pocket millions of euros from rigged public contracts." Raggi has accused the political elite of creating "a pit of waste" and of "robb[ing] Rome" with their corruption.

"The level of corruption we are witnessing in Rome", wrote one observer in 2015, "suggests that Italy needs a major change in mentality, a cultural revolution."

== A positive view of Italian corruption ==
In 2001, British author and physician Theodore Dalrymple argued that corruption is the "one saving grace" of Italian public administration. Dalrymple explained his view that Italy's government was overburdened with an inefficient bureaucracy that slowed down any progress but that corruption and bribery to bypass roadblocks allowed for some progress to be made.

Dalrymple further maintained that the open display of corruption on the part of government officials causes Italian citizens to view the government as the 'enemy', an attitude that Dalrymple considered sensible and healthy, as compared with the misguided British belief that the state is purely good. This belief, Dalrymple charged, "has completely eroded the proud and sturdy independence of the British population."

== Anti-corruption efforts ==
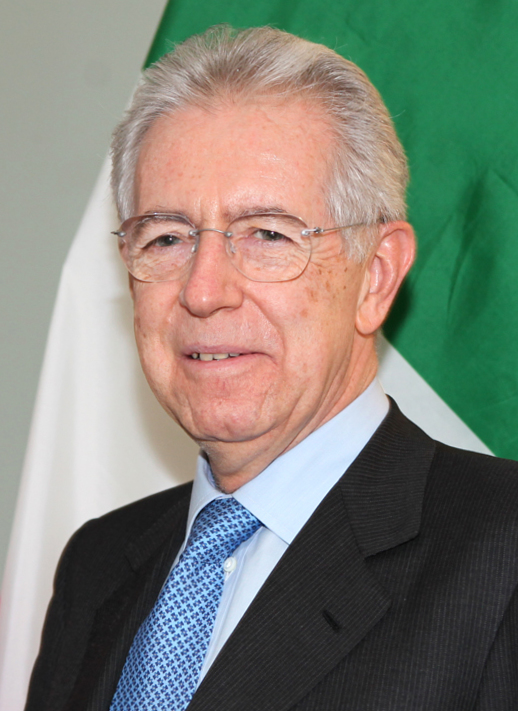
Mario Monti

In a May 2015 article for Open Democracy, Andrea Capussela and Vito Intini noted that Italy's anti-corruption efforts are inadequate and are not pursued with any enthusiasm. Since 1994, they explained, Italy has seen a series of laws passed that weakened the government's ability to combat corruption. For example, the statute of limitations was cut in half, procedural rules were made more complicated, and some corruption-related acts were decriminalized. A new anti-corruption law passed in 2012 did not reverse these laws and is widely considered weak. Capussela and Intini asked explicitly: "Why were such laws adopted and never reversed and how could the political élite get away with it?" This state of affairs was especially puzzling, they pointed out since the struggle against corruption had often been high on the agenda of any rising politician for two decades.

The Italian Anti-Corruption Law of 2012 expanded the definition of corruption and enhanced transparency and disclosure requirements for public-sector workers. It also introduced "white lists" of suppliers, service providers, and construction firms that comply with anti-mafia laws. In addition, it established the National Anti-Corruption Authority, which has the power to investigate corruption cases, and the National Anti-Corruption Plan. The law banned persons convicted of corruption from running for public office, increased prison sentences for officials convicted of abuse of office or demanding bribes, increased penalties for private-sector corruption, and called for the institution of local anti-corruption plans and greater transparency in hiring and budgets. The law criminalized influence trading in both the public and private sectors, protected whistleblowers, and prohibited corrupt officials from holding certain administrative positions. But proper enforcement of the law continues to be complicated by a slow, overburdened judiciary.

There are effective means of investigating police abuse and corruption, but the process is hampered by slow courts. The Code of Conduct of Public Officials includes detailed prescriptions involving transparency, conflicts of interest, and gifts. There are also Rules on Protocol Gifts that forbid gifts to public officials, who are required to report their assets.

Italy is a signatory to the Council of Europe's Civil and Criminal Law Conventions against Corruption, the UNCAC, and the OECD's Anti-Bribery Convention.

Mario Monti, prime minister from 2011 to 2013, sponsored a 2012 anti-corruption law that was described by Transparency International as an insufficient "first step". In 2012, 64% of Italians described government anti-corruption efforts as ineffective. Only 19 percent think such efforts are effective.

The Italian National Anti-Corruption Authority (ANAC) is an independent regulatory body set up in 2009. It is empowered to inspect offices and confiscate documents. In 2016, the ANAC and the European Anti-Fraud Office (OLAF) announced a partnership to fight corruption throughout the EU.

== See also ==
- Crime in Italy
- International Anti-Corruption Academy
- Group of States Against Corruption
- International Anti-Corruption Day
- ISO 37001 Anti-bribery management systems
- OECD Anti-Bribery Convention
- Police corruption in Italy
- Transparency International
- United Nations Convention against Corruption
