= Ivano Sacchetti =

Italian manager

Ivano Sacchetti is an Italian manager. He was the Vice-President of Unipol until 31 December 2005, when he resigned following the bancopoli scandal. On 25 October 2006 he was sentenced to six months in jail for insider trading, together with Giovanni Consorte and Emilio Gnutti. He appealed, but on 12 November 2007 the sentence was upheld by the Milan Court of Appeal.
