= Banca Popolare di Lanciano e Sulmona =

Italian cooperative bank

- Native name: Banca Popolare di Lanciano e Sulmona S.p.A.
- Formerly: Banca Popolare di Lanciano e Sulmona S.c.r.l.
- Company type: subsidiary of a listed company
- Predecessor: Banca Popolare di Lanciano; Banca Agricola Industriale di Sulmona
- Founded: 2 December 1962; 13 April 1991 (BLS)
- Defunct: 2013
- Fate: absorbed by BPER
- Headquarters: 76 Viale Cappuccini, Lanciano, Italy
- Owner: Banca Popolare dell'Emilia Romagna (91%); Fondazione Pescara Abruzzo (1%); others (8%)
- Parent: Banca Popolare dell'Emilia Romagna
- Website: Official website

Banca Popolare di Lanciano e Sulmona S.p.A., known as BLS, was an Italian cooperative bank based in Lanciano, in Province of Chieti, in Abruzzo region. It was absorbed into Banca Popolare dell'Emilia Romagna in 2013.

== History ==
=== Banca Popolare di Lanciano ===
Banca Popolare di Lanciano was incorporated on 2 December 1962.

=== Banca Popolare di Lanciano e Sulmona ===
On 13 April 1991 it was merged with Banca Agricola Industriale di Sulmona to form Banca Popolare di Lanciano e Sulmona società cooperativa a responsabilità limitata (BLS s.c.r.l.).

==== As a subsidiary of BPER ====
In 1995 the bank was transformed from a limited partnership (s.c.r.l.) to a limited company (Italian: società per azioni), and the controlling interests were acquired by Banca Popolare dell'Emilia Romagna (BPER). BLS absorbed Banca di Credito Cooperativo di Villamagna in 1996, Banca di Credito Cooperativo di Avezzano and Banca di Credito Cooperativo di Castel Frentano in 2000.

Finbanche d'Abruzzo also became a sub-holding company of the bank in 2000 (for 48.142% shares); the sub-holding was a joint-venture of BPER (51.878%), La Fondiaria Assicurazioni (15.4%) and Fondazione Cassa di Risparmio della Provincia dell'Aquila (Fondazione Carispaq, 32.72%). BPER owned 2.185% shares of BLS directly as at 31 December 2000. Finbanche d'Abruzzo also owned 82.5% shares of Cassa di Risparmio della Provincia dell'Aquila (Carispaq). In 2005 BPER owned 100% shares of the sub-holding. In 2008 Finbanche d'Abruzzo was absorbed into BPER, which BPER owned 54.022% shares of BLS directly as of 31 December 2008.

As of 31 December 2012 BPER owned 91% shares of the bank, with Fondazione Pescara Abruzzo owned 1% and the rest owned by other shareholders. The bank had a Tier 1 capital ratio of 17.38%, and a shareholders' equity of €320 million. In mid-2013 BPER acquired all the shares of BLS, and was absorbed into BPER.

== See also ==
- List of banks in Italy

== See also ==
- Nuova Cassa di Risparmio di Chieti, another bank based in the Province of Chieti
