= Unipol Banca =

Italian bank

- Formerly: Banca dell'Economia Cooperativa
- Type: subsidiary
- Industry: Financial services
- Founded: 1987
- Headquarters: Bologna, Italy
- Number of locations: 258 branches (2018)
- Area served: Most of Italy; (except Calabria, Molise and Aosta Valley)
- Key people: Giuseppe Santella (Chairman)
- Owner: BPER Banca (100%)
- Parent: BPER Banca
- Website: www.unipolbanca.it (in Italian)

Unipol Banca S.p.A. was an Italian bank based in Bologna, Emilia-Romagna, prior to its acquisition by BPER Banca from the Unipol group in 2019. On 25 November 2019, Unipol Banca was fully incorporated into BPER Banca and ceased to exist as a separate entity.

== History ==
=== Banca dell'Economia Cooperativa ===
Banca dell'Economia Cooperativa (Banec) was found in 1987 by Unipol Assicurazioni (now Unipol Group) and some consumers union of Italy . Cassa di Risparmio in Bologna (Carisbo) was a minority shareholder of the bank for 12% as at 31 December 1993 (10.24% as in 1997). In 1995, Unipol became a minority shareholders of Casse Emiliano Romagnole (CAER), the parent company of Carisbo, for 3.64% (increased to 6.61% in January 1998 by subscribing new shares; diluted to 4.55% in 1999 and 1.82% due to the formation of Cardine Banca in 2000). In turn, CAER owned Finsoe, the holding company of Unipol, for 9.80% (increased to 9.82% in 1996), as well as owned 6.99% shares of Banec directly (increased to 9.75% in 1996). By only counting direct ownership of CAER and Caribso, CAER Group had a minority ownership of 19.99% on Banec. At that time CAER was one of the banks network that Unipol sold their insurances through it.

=== Unipol Banca ===
In December 1998, BANEC became Unipol Banca, as Unipol increased its possession from 16.74% to 69.15% in September. Unipol decided to build their own bank to conglomerate a bank-insurance business model. CAER remain the direct owner of 9.75% shares, but Carisbo sold all their shares. Unipol's ownership on the bank was increased again to 74.81% in 1999, 81.03% in 2000 and again to 81.07% in 2002. The tie with Cardine Banca (ex-CAER) also broke up in 2001, which Cardine sold the shares of Finsoe and Unipol Banca; Carisbo sold the shares of Linear Assicurazioni (20% to Unipol) and UniSalute (9.9% to Unipol). CAER decreased to own Unipol Banca 8% directly in 1999 and to 4% in 2000. After the deal Cardine owned 3.73% shares of Unipol Assicurazioni and Unipol Assicurazioni owned 1.80% shares of Cardine Banca. In 2003, a sister company, MeieAurora acquired 10% shares by subscribing new shares for €67.2 million, with the insurance company hold 82.86% directly by acquiring €149.8 million new shares. In December 2003, MeieAurora also purchased the shares of Reti Bancarie for €173.4 million, instead of pouring into Unipol Banca. However, Aurora also received exclusive rights to sell the insurance product in Reti Bancarie's network for 5-year.

In 2006, Unipol owned 69.54% shares of the bank directly and 14.99% through Aurora Assicurazioni (ex-MeieAurora) due to capital increases. The ratio became 67.75% and 16.78% ([new] Aurora Assicurazioni) in 2007. [new] Aurora Assicurazioni merged with [new] Unipol Assicurazioni in 2009; the new subsidiaries acquired the remain shares of Unipol Banca from the shareholders of Unipol Group (4.99% from Finsoe S.p.A., 4.99% from Holmo S.p.A. and 5.49% from Coop Estense S.c.a.r.l.), making the bank a wholly owned subsidiary of the group. It was a consequence of Banca Monte dei Paschi di Siena withdrew from Finsoe from February 2007 to June 2008, which the shares of Finsoe was sold to Finsoe and Holmo.

After the creation of sister company UnipolSai, Banca Sai was absorbed by Unipol Banca in 2014. The listing of [new] Unipol Assicurazioni as UnipolSai, also made the bank not longer a wholly owned subsidiary of Unipol Group.

In February 2019, BPER Banca announced the acquisition of Unipol Banca from Unipol and UnipolSai. The deal was completed in July 2019, which the bad loan of Unipol Banca was sold back to Unipol's wholly owned subsidiary UnipolReC. In August, a plan to closing Unipol Banca and absorbed into the parent company, was announced.

On 25 November 2019, Unipol Banca was incorporated into BPER Banca.

== See also ==
- List of banks in Italy
