= Finsoe =

- Native name: Finsoe S.p.A.
- Formerly: Finanziaria dell'economia Sociale
- Type: Coop owned holding company
- Headquarters: 2/2 Piazza della Costituzione, Bologna, Italy
- Net income: ▲€72.0 million (2015)
- Total assets: ▲€90.1102 billion (2015)
- Total equity: ▼€1.6039 billion (2015)
- Owner: Coop Alleanza 3.0 (34.16%); Holmo S.p.A. (23.83%); Cooperare S.p.A. (8.61%); Novacoop S.C. (5.50%); Unicoop Tirreno S.C. (5.25%); and 17 others (22.65%)
- Website: Official website (in Italian)
- Footnotes in consolidated basis

Finsoe S.p.A. (acronym of Finanziaria dell'economia Sociale) is an intermediate holding company for several coop societies of Coop (Italy). Finsoe was the major shareholders of Unipol (31.40% share capitals) and in the past, had a direct minority shareholding in Unipol Banca (sold to Unipol in August 2008). Until 2015 Unipol had two class of shares, making Finsoe hold 50.75% voting rights and 31.40% share capital on Unipol. However, in mid-2015 all shares were converted to ordinary shares.

== History ==
=== Alliance with Casse Emiliano Romagnole ===
From 1995 to 2001, Casse Emiliano Romagnole (CAER), the Bank Group of Cassa di Risparmio in Bologna (Carisbo), had a cross ownership with Finsoe. CAER was a minority shareholders of Finsoe for 9.80% in 1995 and Unipol (at that time Unipol Assicurazioni) had a minority ownership in CAER for 3.64%. Unipol and Carisbo also had some joint venture at that time, namely UniSalute, Noricum Assicurazioni, Linear Assicurazioni and Banca dell'Economia Cooperativa (renamed to Unipol Banca in 2008). In 2001 Cardine Banca (ex-CAER) sold all the shares in Finsoe and Unipol Banca, which that year Cardine and Unipol had cross ownership only (Fincaer, a subsidiary, owned 3.73% ordinary shares of Unipol (2.261% of shares capitals); Unipol owned 1.80% shares of Cardine), as well as only Noricum Assicurazioni remained as a joint venture.

=== Alliance with BAM and Banca MPS ===
In 1998 Banca Agricola Mantovana (BAM) became a minority shareholders of Finsoe (5.601% as in 2000). In the same year Quadrifoglio Vita became a joint venture of Unipol, a subsidiary of Finsoe and BAM. BAM was acquired by Banca Monte dei Paschi di Siena (Banca MPS) in 1999. In 2001 Banca MPS purchased 20% shares of Finsoe . At the same time Unipol also owned 2% of Banca MPS.

In February 2003 Banca MPS purchased an additional 170,281,786 number of shares of Finsoe from Hopa S.p.A. for €179.3 million, making Banca MPS owned 39% shares of Finsoe. Banca MPS also purchased 20,475,000 of Hopa shares from Fingruppo Holding for €52.9 million, which was increased from 7.671% to 9.17%. Banca MPS also contributed in the capital increases of Finsoe which was used to acquire Winterthur Italia.

In 2004 Finsoe bought back the minority interests of Linear Assicurazioni and UniSalute from Banca MPS.

In 2005 Banca MPS did not participate in the capital increases of Finsoe. Banca MPS's ownership ratio on Finsoe was fall from 39% to 27.839%. After Unipol failed to take over Banca Nazionale del Lavoro, on 13 February 2007 Banca MPS sold 14.839% shares of Finsoe to Holmo for €350.4 million. Immediately after the deal, Holmo owned 71.074% shares of Finsoe and Banca MPS owned 13% shares of Finsoe. In June 2008 Banca MPS sold all the shares to Finsoe and Holmo for €234.4 million. Quadrifoglio Vita was also sold by Unipol to AXA (via Banca MPS) in 2008.

=== Alliance with BNP Paribas ===
In February 2006 BNP Paribas acquired 4.5% shares of Finsoe from Holmo. The French company also acquired all the shares of Banca Nazionale del Lavoro that Unipol owned. From 2010 to 2012 BNP Paribas sold all the shares of Finsoe to Spring 2 S.r.l., another intermediate holding company for the coop societies. BNP Paribas also acquired 51% shares of BNL Vita from Unipol in 2011.

=== Withdrew from Unipol Banca ===
In August 2008 Finsoe all their shares (4.99%) in Unipol Banca to Aurora Assicurazioni, a subsidiary of Unipol for €68.6 million. Holmo also sold 4.99% shares to Aurora in order to finance the shares buy back of Finsoe from Banca Banca Monte dei Paschi di Siena in June 2008.

=== Recent changes ===
As in February 2011 Holmo S.p.A., itself another intermediate holding company for the coop societies, was the major shareholders of Finsoe for 76.5%. However, the shares were transferred to the coop societies instead soon after. After the formation of Coop Alleanza 3.0 on 1 January 2016, the coop society became the largest single shareholders of Finsoe.

== Shareholders ==
1. Coop Alleanza 3.0 S.C. (34.16%)
2. Holmo S.p.A. (23.83%)
3. Cooperare S.p.A. (8.61%)
4. Novacoop S.C. (5.50%)
5. Unicoop Tirreno S.C. (5.25%)
6. Spring 2 S.r.l. (4.68%)
7. P&V Assurances (3.35%)
8. Coop Lombardia S.C. (3.22%)
9. CCPL S.p.A.( 1.97%)
10. PAR.COOP.IT S.p.A. (1.21%)
11. J.P. Morgan Securities PLC (1.02%)
12. Parco S.p.A. (0.23%)
13. Unibon S.p.A. (0.18%)
14. Sofinco S.p.A. (0.17%)
15. Cesi S.C. (0.06%)
16. Cefla Capital Services S.p.A. (0.06%)
17. Consorzio Cooperative Costruzioni S.C. (0.06%)
18. S.C. va Muratori e Braccianti di Carpi (0.06%)
19. CAMST S.C. (0.03%)
20. Coop. Costruzioni S.C. (0.03%)
21. Manutencoop S.C. (0.03%)
22. Unieco S.C. (0.03%)
