= DDOR Novi Sad =

Serbian insurance company

- Official logo

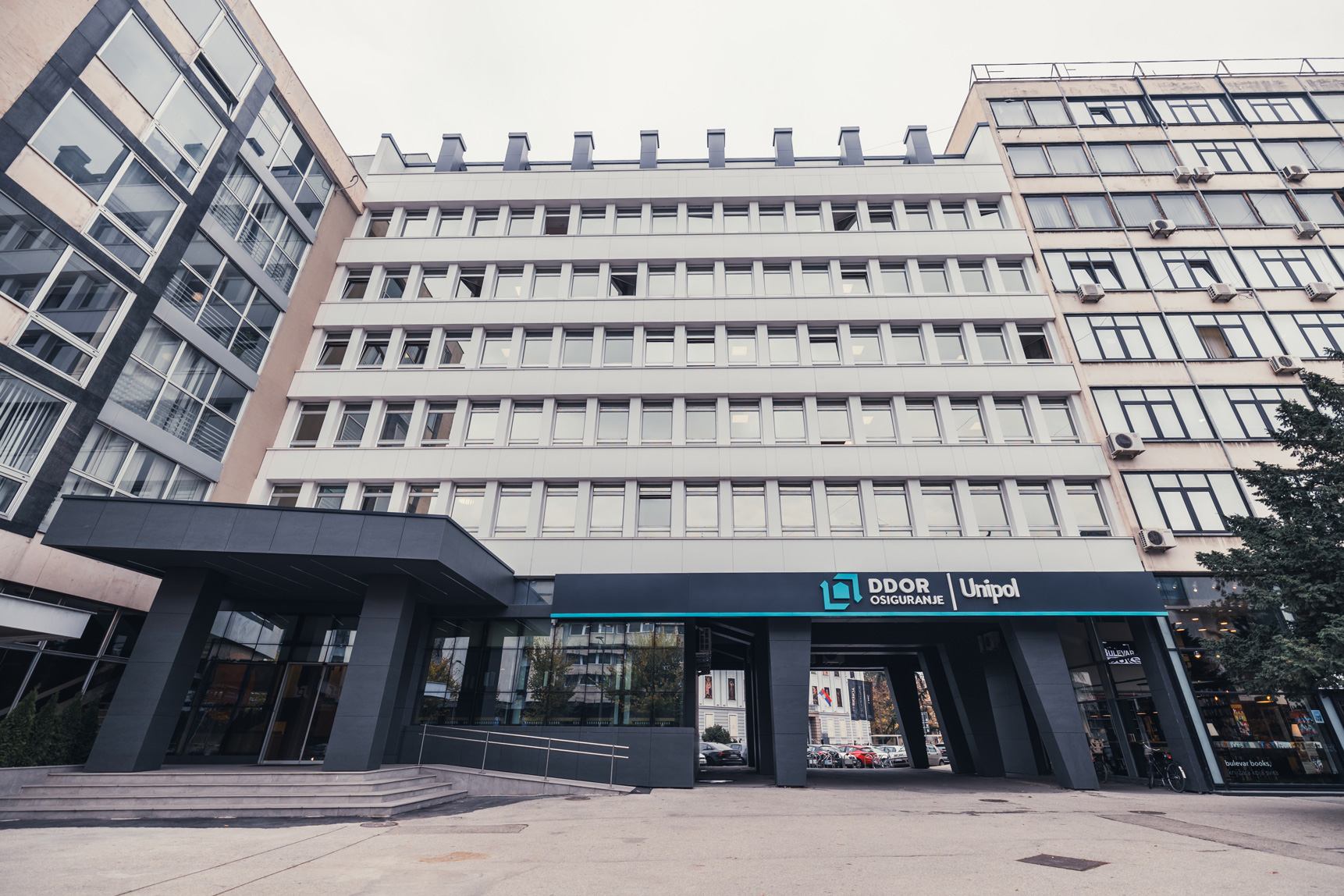
- Headquarters of DDOR Novi Sad
- Native name: ДДОР Нови Сад
- Company type: Joint-stock company
- Industry: Finance and Insurance
- Founded: 28 April 1981; 45 years ago (Current form); 1945; 81 years ago (Founded)
- Headquarters: Bulevar Mihajla Pupina 8, Novi Sad, Serbia
- Area served: Serbia
- Key people: Vladimir Malešević (Chairman of Executive Board)
- Services: Non-life insurance Life insurance
- Revenue: ▲€90.22 million (2018)
- Net income: ▲€5.51 million (2018)
- Total assets: ▲€159.39 million (2018)
- Total equity: ▲€49.06 million (2018)
- Owner: UnipolSai (100.00%)
- Number of employees: 1,379 (2018)
- Website: www.ddor.rs
- Footnotes / references Business ID: 08194815; Tax ID: 101633677

DDOR Novi Sad (Serbian Cyrillic: ДДОР Нови Сад) is a Serbian insurance company based in Novi Sad, Serbia. It is the third largest insurance company in Serbia by market share, offering auto, home, commercial and life insurance.

== History ==
In 1945, the government founded the National Insurance and Reinsurance Bureau after the Second World War. By 1950 two offices were set up in Novi Sad. Both offices started operating as branch offices of NIB. By the end of 1961, the National Insurance Bureau was dissolved. The former NIB's branch offices became insurance bureaus but new insurance bureaus were also founded to cover the area of one or more municipalities. On the basis of provisions of the Law on Insurance Bureau and Communities of Insurance (terminology used during socialism), at the end of 1961, the municipality of Novi Sad made the decision with regard to establishing of the "Novi Sad" Insurance Bureau. Their activities were carried out on the territory of the municipality of Novi Sad and they were considered to be a legal successor to the former NIB, with their headquarters located in Novi Sad. Besides "Novi Sad" Insurance Bureau, that only re-registered its name, in 1968 another insurance firm was established in Novi Sad - "Vojvodina" Insurance Bureau. The two companies merged into one in 1981.

On 25 June 1990, DDOR Novi Sad became the first joint stock insurance company on the territory of the former SFR Yugoslavia.

As of 2016, DDOR Novi Sad has 14.1% of non-life premium income market share and 11.6% of market share in total in Serbia, making it the third largest insurance company in the Serbian insurance market.

== Ownership ==
On 26 July 2006 state office for privatization started the process to sell state shares in the company. On 26 November 2007, it was announced that 100% of the state stake in DDOR was sold to Italian company Fondiaria-Sai (now part of UnipolSai) for €264 million.

As of February 2018, DDOR Novi Sad is fully owned by UnipolSai.

== See also ==
- Insurance in Serbia
