= Cassa di Risparmio della Provincia dell'Aquila =

Italian savings bank

- Trade name: Carispaq
- Formerly: Cassa di Risparmio dell'Aquila
- Company type: subsidiary
- Industry: Financial services
- Founded: 1859; 1992 (spin off)
- Defunct: 2013
- Fate: absorbed into parent company
- Successor: Fondazione Carispaq (since 1992); local branches of BPER (since 2013)
- Headquarters: L'Aquila, Italy
- Services: Retail banking
- Owner: Banca Popolare dell'Emilia Romagna
- Parent: Banca Popolare dell'Emilia Romagna
- Website: carispaq.it

Cassa di Risparmio della Provincia dell'Aquila (Carispaq) was an Italian savings bank, based in L'Aquila, Abruzzo region. The bank was absorbed into parent company Banca Popolare dell'Emilia Romagna in 2013.

Fondazione Cassa di Risparmio della Provincia dell'Aquila, the parent organization that the bank was spin off from in 1992, still operates as a charity organization.

== History ==
Cassa di Risparmio dell'Aquila was found in 1859 in the Kingdom of the Two Sicilies. However, the bank was opened in 1862, the year after the unification of Italy. The bank was renamed into Cassa di Risparmio della Provincia dell'Aquila (Carispaq) in 1955.

Due to Legge Amato, the organization was split into Cassa di Risparmio della Provincia dell'Aquila S.p.A. (limited company) and Fondazione Cassa di Risparmio della Provincia dell'Aquila (banking foundation) on 20 August (gazetted on 3 September). Banca di Roma also subscribed to the capital increase of 63 billion lire, for 20% shares. In 1998 the minority interests was acquired by La Fondiaria Assicurazioni.

=== As a subsidiary of Finbanche d'Abruzzo ===
In 1999–2000 Finbanche d'Abruzzo S.p.A. became the sub-holding company of Carispaq S.p.A. (for 82.5%), which was a joint venture of Banca Popolare dell'Emilia Romagna (51.878%), La Fondiaria Assicurazioni (15.4%) and the banking foundation (32.72%); the sub-holding also owned 48.142% shares of Banca Popolare di Lanciano e Sulmona (previously controlled by BPER directly). The foundation retained 17.5% shares of Carispaq directly. In 2004 Fondiaria-Sai sold 15.4% Finbanche d'Abruzzo and 4.5% shares of Banca della Campania to BPER. In December 2004 both Finbanche d'Abruzzo and Carispaq proposed capital increases, making the foundation hold 25.991% shares of Finbanche d'Abruzzo, as well as maintaining 17.5% direct ownership on Carispaq.

=== As a subsidiary of BPER ===
In 2005 BPER owned 100% shares of Finbanche d'Abruzzo by acquiring the remaining 25.991% shares from the banking foundation for about €73 million. Due to another capital increases, Finbanche d'Abruzzo owned 79.922% shares of Carispaq (decreased from 82.5%), and the foundation owned 16.953%, with the rest (3.125%) was owned by others. in 2008 Finbanche d'Abruzzo was absorbed into BPER.

In 2011 BPER offered to the public to acquire all the remaining shares of the bank from the minority shareholders. The foundation received 1,915,453 number of new shares of BPER by selling 11.853% shares of Carispaq. The remaining 5.1% was sold in 2013 for about €7.26 million from the foundation. In the same year Carispaq was absorbed into BPER, along with Banca Popolare di Lanciano e Sulmona. The last annual report of Carispaq showed the bank had a shareholders' equity of €196.803 million as of 31 December 2012, and a Tier 1 capital ratio of 9.37%.

== See also ==
- Banca Tercas
  - Banca Caripe
- Nuova Cassa di Risparmio di Chieti
- List of banks in Italy
