= Vito Bonsignore =

Italian politician (born 1943)

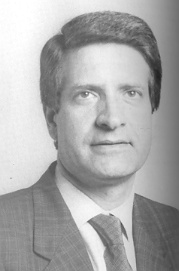
Vito Bonsignore

Vito Bonsignore (born 3 July 1943 in Bronte, Catania, Sicily) is an Italian politician.

== Biography ==
Bonsignore graduated in economics and commerce in Messina. He was manager of the Turin-Alessandria-Piacenza (SATAP) motorway company, where he gradually held increasingly important roles, until becoming technical director and general manager. He was also Director of the Italian Mobiliar Institute (IMI) and INSUD S.p.A.

He has been member of the central direction of the Christian Democracy, from 1970 to 1980, was municipal councilor of Venaria Reale, MP in the Chamber of Deputies from 1987 to 1994, and Undersecretary of the Budget (from 1992 to 1993) in the Giuliano Amato government.

He was also elected MEP twice, the first time in 2004 on the UDC list (in the North-West constituency), the second time in 2009 on The People of Freedom's list, receiving over 53,000 personal preferences. He was a member of the European People's Party group of which he was vice-president. He sat on the European Parliament's Committee on Budgetary Control and its Committee on Budgets. He was also a vice-chair of the Delegation for relations with the United States and a substitute for the Delegation to the ACP-EU Joint Parliamentary Assembly.

On 16 November 2013 he joined the New Centre-Right led by Angelino Alfano.

== Conviction ==
He has been convicted and sentenced to 2 years for attempted corruption in the construction of a hospital in Asti.

During Mani pulite (in Turin), he was accused by Alberto Zamorani of accepting more than 100 million of lire as under-secretary of the Budget (1992), hidden in a chocolate box. This assertion turned out to be groundless and did not result in any actual charge or imputation.

In 2011 he was sentenced to three years in prison and fined 600,000 euros, together with the financier Emilio Gnutti, the builder Gaetano Caltagirone and the industrialists Ettore Lonati and Tiberio Lonati. Same penalty for Stefano Ricucci, Giovanni Leoni, Giuseppe Statuto, Danilo Coppola, for the Unipol climb. On 6 December 2013 the Milan Court of Appeal totally overturned the first degree sentence and acquitted him because "the fact does not exist": in the grounds of the sentence, in fact, the judges of the third penal section wrote that the alleged occult pact between Unipol, the "friendly banks" and the so-called "contropattisti" was only a "theorem" brought to trial and based on "mere perceptions, inferences or presumptions". On 6 May 2015, the Cassation confirmed the acquittal by putting an end to the affair.
