= Bancopoli =

"Bancopoli" was the name coined by the Italian press for the finance and banking scandals between July 2005 and January 2006. The Italian Banca Popolare Italiana (BPI), in competition with Dutch ABN AMRO for control of Banca Antonveneta, was given an unfair advantage by Banca d'Italia's (Italy's central bank) president, Antonio Fazio.

Fazio was forced to resign and BPI Managing Director, Gianpiero Fiorani, was arrested on a number of charges in connection with the attempted takeover, having been accused of using illegal procedures. Giovanni Consorte, head of the Italian insurance company Unipol, was also forced to resign due to implications that he was connected with the Antonveneta scheme and another attempted takeover of the Italian Banca Nazionale del Lavoro (BNL). Ultimately, ABN AMRO gained control of Antonveneta and the French BNP Paribas attained control of BNL.

== Italian and foreign interest in Antonveneta and BNL ==
=== Antonveneta ===
During the summer of 2004, ABN AMRO sought authorization from the Banca d'Italia to increase its ownership share of the Antonveneta bank from 12.6% to 20%, thereby making it the largest single shareholder. On 14 February 2005, the Italian bank BPI, (known at the time as Banca Popolare di Lodi (BPL)) received permission from the Banca d'Italia to raise its holdings in Antonveneta to 15%.

On 30 March 2005, ABN AMRO launched a bid for Antonveneta and a month later, on 29 April, BPL proposed a merger with Antonveneta.

=== BNL ===
On 29 March 2005, the Spanish bank, BBVA, launched a bid to increase its controlling share of 15% in order to become the majority shareholder of BNL. In the same year, on 19 July, the Italian insurance company, Unipol, launched a takeover bid for a controlling interest in BNL. Unipol's bid created competition between two Italian companies and two foreign banks for ownership of the domestically owned banks in Italy.

== Scandal ==
The scandal became public on 25 July 2005 when the public prosecutor's office in Milan ordered the judicial seizure of any Antonveneta bank shares owned by BPL (at this time named Banca Popolare Italiana (BPI)) following an investigation that began on 2 May. This case was investigated by public prosecutors Eugenio Fusco and Giulia Perrotta.

Close personal ties between BPL Managing Director Gianpiero Fiorani and Banca d'Italia Governor Antonio Fazio ensured prompt authorization of BPL's requests, while those of ABN Amro were stalled. According to the Italian markets regulator Commissione Nazionale per le Società e la Borsa (CONSoB), BPL had been purchasing Antonveneta stocks since November 2004 through a secret shareholder agreement and as late as 17 January 2005, but declared only a little over 2% ownership.

On 14 February 2005, BPL assumed control of Antonveneta with 52% in aggregate shares of the bank. BPL had direct control of 15% of the stock and the rest were controlled through other associated companies: Fingruppo, Gp Finanziaria, Unipol, and Magiste. Fiorani revealed under questioning in December 2005, that the operation was financed by amassing money through illegal bank charges and by taking it from accounts of deceased people.

=== Preliminary investigation ===
On 2 May 2005, the prosecutor in Milan began putting together a case against unidentified persons who had infiltrated Antonveneta. The allegations were of stock manipulation, specifically attempting to influence the price of Antonveneta stock through an active misinformation campaign. Fifteen days later the prosecutor released the initial group of names being investigated. Fiorani and Emilio Gnutti were among the twenty-three personnel identified. They were key shareholders of Fingruppo, Gp Finanziaria, and Hopa. The Italian Prime Minister also had these companies in his portfolio, managed by Mediaset and Fininvest, already co-authors of the inflation of Telecom Italia. Also identified was Roberto Colaninno of Olivetti, Vice President of Banca Monte dei Paschi di Siena previously convicted for insider trading. On 8 June the tribunal of Padua suspended the Antonveneta Board of Directors as a result of the investigations.

Meanwhile, prosecutors in Rome decided to open a case on banking sector developments and Fiorani was added to the list of names being investigated as of 12 July. It was immediately clear that this was a major scandal. Three days later on 15 July, Francesco Frasca the head of the Banca d'Italia's investigator's office working with prosecutors Perla Lori and Achille Toro, released the list of persons under investigation in Rome.

Adding to public indignation was the publication of transcripts of intercepted telephone calls between the central characters involved in the scandal. In particular, the call in which Fazio gave Fiorani Banca d'Italia's permission to conduct the transactions was considered astonishing as it displayed such familiarity between the two banks and gave the public a greater appreciation of the full extent of the scandal.

=== The scandal explodes ===
On 25 July, the lead investigators for the Milan inquiry, Fusco and Perrotti, had all Antonveneta stock held by BPI and its allies seized. Among those identified were Emilio Gnutti; Stefano Ricucci, owner of Magiste previously implicated in the murky inflation of RCS; the Lonatis; and Danilo Coppola. The seizure notice also mentioned several wiretaps which implicated Fazio and Fiorani. The prosecutors used this as proof that the inflation was illegally planned. On 2 August the judge for the preliminary investigation Clementina Forleo validated the stock seizure and directed measures against Fiorani and Gianfranco Boni, the BPI financial director.

On 16 September Fiorani resigned from the Board of BPI, amid new allegations against his office. He was charged with stock manipulation, insider trading, and obstruction of the CONSoB investigation. Fiorani was further charged with making false statements to a public office and publishing false evaluations and prospectus. The allegations were that Fiorani had personally enriched himself through financing his own bank.

=== The inquiry widens ===
Meanwhile, the scandal was discussed in political circles, with Fazio singled out as the principal culprit and there were repeated calls for his resignation. After some deliberation, on 22 September finance minister Domenico Siniscalco resigned in protest against the government's failure to oust Fazio.

On 29 September the news filtered down that the head of Banca d'Italia had been investigated since early August by the prosecutor in Rome for possible abuse of his office in relation to the Antonveneta inquiry. Summoned by the magistrates, Fazio was to be questioned on 10 October.

On 6 December the entire Board of Directors, the executive committee, and auditors of BPI came under investigation for stock manipulation. This was a new threat of an inquiry and it rocked the economic world.

On 7 December Giovanni Consorte, head of the insurance company Unipol, was added to the list of those being investigated for his participation in the buying of Antonveneta shares on behalf of Fiorani.

== Gianpiero Fiorani arrested, Fazio and Consorte resign ==
On 13 December the major charge of association with criminal intent was added against Fiorani. The inquiry was now working on three primary accusations: association with criminal intent, stock manipulation, and embezzlement. The embezzlement stemmed from Fiorani taking money from current accounts of the clients in his own bank. Judge Forleo, at the request of the prosecutor, issued an order to take Fiorani into custody.

The same day Vito Bonsignore came under investigation for stock manipulation, a Member of the European Parliament from the Union of Christian and Centre Democrats (UDC) party and an entrepreneur. He owned Gefip, a company that was assumed to have participated in the stock inflation orchestrated by Fiorani. However, the assumptions turned out to be groundless as, during the investigation, it was found that neither Gefip nor Bonsignore participated in such stock manipulation so no charge or imputation was carried out.

On 15 December Giovanni Consorte, Unipol's chairman and chief executive, came under investigation by the prosecutor of Rome for stock manipulation, market manipulation, and obstruction relating to an inquiry into the inflation of BNL. CONSoB asserted that a pact existed between Unipol and Deutsche Bank.

Fiorani, questioned on 17 December, made several admissions to accumulating 70 million euros at the expense of his clients.

The Governor of Banca d'Italia, by now implicated in the inquiry and under a great deal of pressure from the Italian parliament, resigned his commission on 19 December. His resignation was accepted by the high council of the central bank the next day.

On 28 December Consorte was forced to relinquish control of Unipol as the list of allegations lengthened. According to the magistrates, Unipol would have aided Fiorani in the illegal inflation of Antonveneta and potentially received benefits from the intricate web of relationships woven with the other so-called furbetti del quartierino (?) for acquiring BNL.

== The resignation of Achille Toro and the victory of ABN Amro bank ==
On 3 January 2006, the prosecutor of Perugia added the name of Achille Toro, special prosecutor of Rome, to the list of people being investigated based on the accusation that he revealed official secrets. Notwithstanding his receiving a declaration of good faith from his office, Toro resigned. Meanwhile, declaring his innocence, from any allegations of involvement with the takeovers of BNL and Antonveneta and related stock activities. The official secret that Toro was thought to have revealed would have been related to those individuals under an ongoing investigation.

The same day, following the acquisition of 25.9% of capital previously controlled by BPI, the Dutch ABN Amro definitively gained control of Antonveneta with 55.8% of the capital. They prepared to launch a takeover bid by the end of the month with the same terms offered the previous July, terms that had been abandoned thanks to the opposition of BPI and its allies.

== The victory by BNP Paribas ==
On 10 January 2006, Banca d'Italia blocked the takeover bid of Unipol on BNL. On 3 February 2006, BNP Paribas acquired the 48% control of BNL that had belonged to Unipol and its associates. They launched a takeover bid of all of the stock holdings. The Spanish BBVA later sold the shares in its possession.

== The publishing by Berlusconi's newspaper Il Giornale and his testimony ==
On 2 January, Il Giornale publicized part of the telephone wiretaps of calls between Consorte and the secretary of the Democratici di Sinistra (DS) party member Piero Fassino and amplified the political scandal. Il Giornale is owned by Paolo Berlusconi the brother of Silvio Berlusconi, then Prime Minister of Italy. The published wiretaps, going back to July 2005, turned out to be irrelevant to the judicial issues and were not even transcribed by the magistrate. However, their publication had a significant effect on politics and the media and was exploited by most of the right-wing politicians in the campaign up to the 9 April elections.

On 12 January, during an episode of Porta a Porta hosted by Bruno Vespa, Silvio Berlusconi revealed that he was aware of the facts regarding the implication of the DS in the issues surrounding Unipol. After repeated requests by the supporters of l'Unione (a centre-left political party) to make an immediate statement to the magistrates, the next day he presented himself to the prosecutor of Rome. He spent 30 minutes in conversation with the magistrates and Berlusconi clarified that he only told the magistrates that he was made aware by Tarak Ben Ammar of an encounter between the heads of the insurance company Assicurazioni Generali and those of Unione, in which Generali was pressured to sell Unipol their own share of BNL, equivalent to 8.7%.

On 18 January the president of Generali, Antoine Bernheim, testified before the magistrate and categorically denied having been pressured to sell by members of the left party, only by Fazio. Ben Ammar confirmed having spoken of these meetings, but he also denied the allegation by Berlusconi, "Bernheim and me never told the president of the Council that political representatives of the left or right applied pressure."

On 25 January the Prosecutor of Rome requested the filing of the brief regarding Berlusconi's deposition, the relevant criminal facts did not correspond to the case and grounds for opening a libel case did not exist.

No information related to the source allowed the journalist from Il Giornale to access the wiretaps. After an investigation ordered by the Ministry of Justice, the diskette containing the original wiretaps was found still in its envelope sealed the previous August. During the parliamentary hearing of one section of the Italian secret service, members of the DS called upon the service to abstain from any intervention that might influence the outcome of the electoral campaign.

== See also ==
- Tangentopoli and the connected enquiry Mani pulite
- List of political scandals in Italian

== Bibliography ==
- Inciucio. (Peter Gomez and Marco Travaglio, 2005, BUR Biblioteca Universale Rizzoli, ISBN 88-17-01020-0).
