= Emilio Gnutti =

Italian businessman

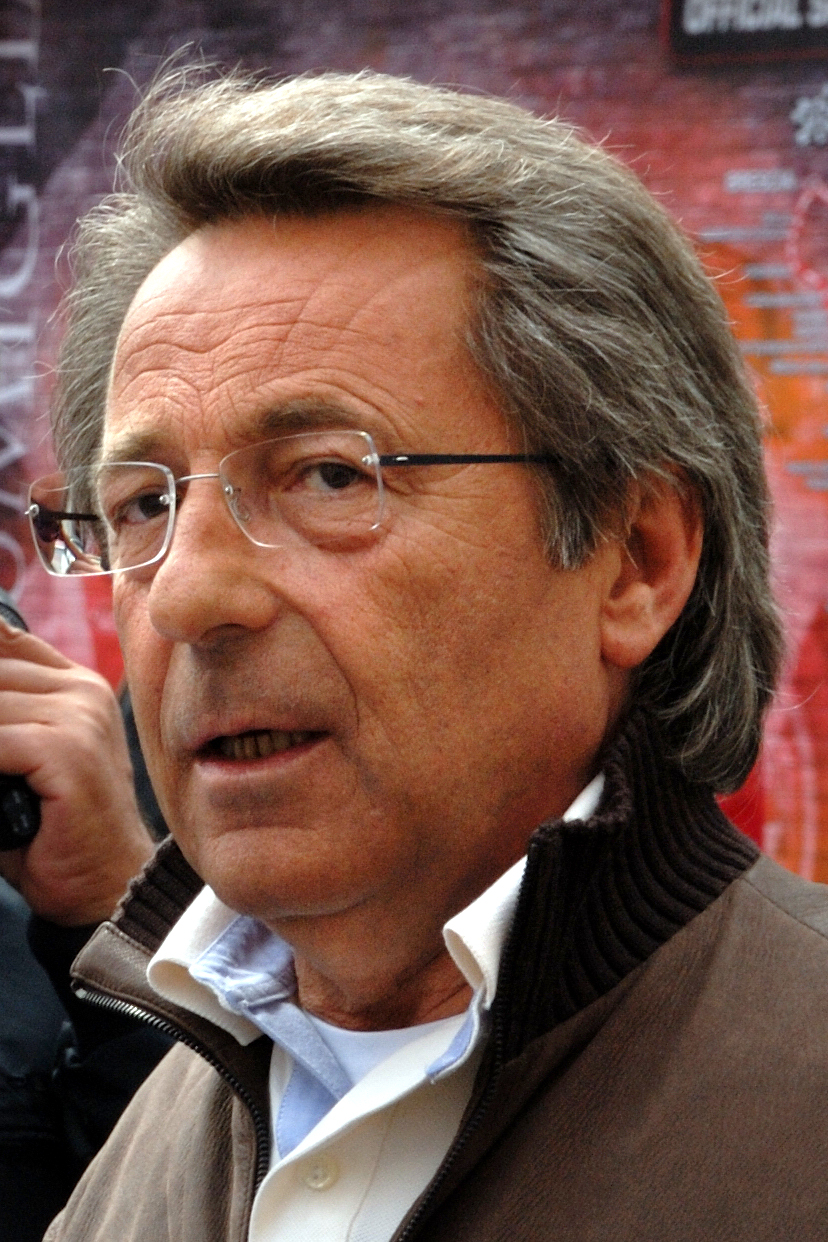
Gnutti in 2007

Emilio Gnutti is an Italian financier and founder of the Hopa SpA holding company. He was involved in many important takeovers, most notably the one of Telecom Italia made in 1999 with Roberto Colaninno, and the subsequent sale of the company to Marco Tronchetti Provera. On 25 October 2006 he was sentenced to six months in jail for insider trading in the Unipol (bancopoli) case, together with Giovanni Consorte and Ivano Sacchetti. He appealed, but then he decided to accept a plea bargain and on 12 November 2007 the Milan Court of Appeal converted the sentence into a fine.
