= Clementina Forleo =

Italian preliminary judge

Maria Clementina Forleo (born 1963, in Francavilla Fontana, province of Brindisi) is an Italian preliminary judge (Giudice per le indagini preliminari, or GIP for short) at the Court of Milan.

She came to national prominence after discovering the existence of audio tapes of telephone calls between high level Italian politicians and Stefano Ricucci and Gianpiero Fiorani. These businessmen had mysteriously become extremely rich in about only 10 years buying and selling very expensive and extravagant luxury real estate properties, with earnings around 100% to 300% over a reasonable market price. Italian journalists have speculated that this could reflect a new way of bribing politicians.

== Education ==
Forleo got her diploma as one of the top 25 high school students in Italy. After getting her degree in law summa cum laude from the University of Bari, she took a series of competitive exams in order to join the police or the judiciary.

In 1989, having won one of the two competitive exams (certamen), Clementina Forleo became a commissioner in the Polizia di Stato. After only one month, having won the other certamen, she resigned from the Italian police in order to begin her career as a judge. During her short time in the police, she received a "solemn praise" (encomio solenne) for her work during the crisis resulting from large-scale illegal immigration from Albania and Africa into the Apulia coastal region of Italy.

== Judicial career ==
Clementina Forleo became famous as a judge when she found two Tunisian nationals, Maher Boujahia and Ali Toumi, and a Moroccan, Mohamed Daki, innocent of the charge of international terrorism. Several Italian and international media organizations criticized her decision, which was motivated by the distinction between the actions committed by freedom fighters and terrorists (the first executing attacks against military targets, the second attacking helpless civilians). This concept was welcomed and further amplified by the judges of the Appeal Court (Corte d'Assise d'Appello).

Later, her judgment was reversed by the Italian Supreme Court (Cassazione) and then by the second Corte d'Assise d'Appello, on October 23 of 2007, noting the terrorist, rather than military nature of the criminal plans that were attributed to the suspects. Mohamed Daki was condemned to 4 years of prison on the charge of international terrorism, and the two Tunisian nationals were sentenced to 6 years.

== Defense of African immigrants ==
Another controversy arose when Clementina Forleo interrupted a violent arrest, involving an officer who was later expelled from the police force. On July 8, 2005, she protested against the violent arrest of an African outside a subway station, after he was found without a valid ticket during a routine check on the train. Forleo arrived at the scene of the arrest, identified herself as a magistrate, and made a complaint about excessive violence on the part of the group of policemen, who then decided to sue her.

== Inquiries about the purchase of the Antonveneta bank involving the PdS party ==
One of the most important inquiries done by Clementina Forleo involved the purchase of Banca Antonveneta in the so-called Bancopoli scandal. This brought her harsh criticism by many members (Clemente Mastella, Massimo D'Alema) of the center-left coalition headed by Premier Romano Prodi.

== Death of her parents in a mysterious car crash ==
She received an anonymous letter threatening her parents with death by car crash. This became reality on August 28, 2005, when her mother and her father lost their lives in a car crash on the road connecting Francavilla Fontana and Sava, in the province of Brindisi. Her father was Gaspare Forleo, 77, an attorney and former mayor of Francavilla Fontana, and her mother was Stella Bungaro, 75, a high school math teacher.
