= Coop Alleanza 3.0 =

European consumers' cooperative

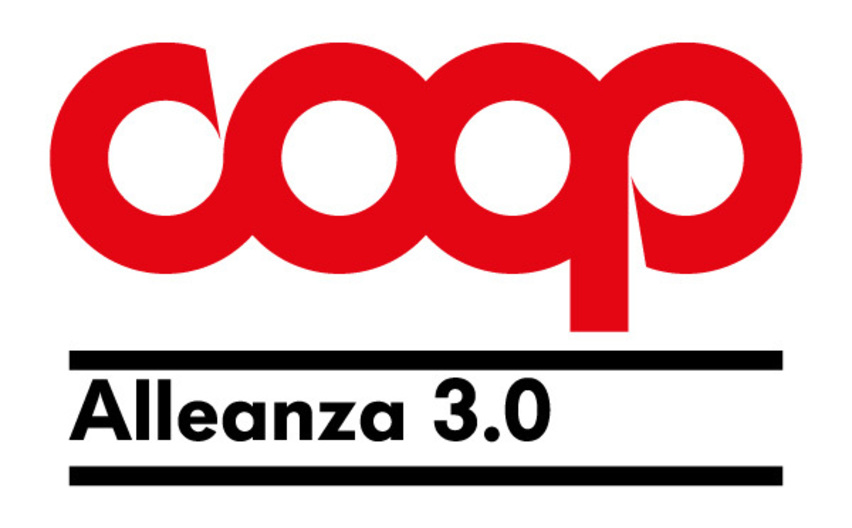
- Type: cooperative
- Industry: Wholesale distribution
- Founded: 2016
- Headquarters: Castenaso, Italy
- Area served: Italy
- Products: food and non-food
- Revenue: €5 billion (2015)
- Members: 2,700,000 (2015)
- Number of employees: 22,000 (2015)
- Subsidiaries: Finsoe (34.16%)
- Website: coopalleanza3-0.it

Coop Alleanza 3.0 is the biggest European consumers' cooperative with 2,700,000 members. Coop Alleanza 3.0 was formed by the merger of the three big cooperatives of the Adriatic Sea area, Coop Adriatica, Coop Consumatori Nordest and Coop Estense on 1 January 2016 and it is part of Coop.

Coop Alleanza 3.0 is the largest shareholders of Unipol Group by direct and indirect ownership via Finsoe.

== Attendance ==
Coop Alleanza 3.0 is present in the provinces of Trieste, Gorizia, Udine, Pordenone, Belluno, Vicenza, Treviso, Padua, Venezia, Treviso, Rovigo, Brescia, Mantua, Piacenza, Parma, Reggio Emilia, Modena, Bologna, Ferrara, Ravenna, Forlì-Cesena, Rimini, Pesaro e Urbino, Ancona, Macerata, Fermo, Ascoli Piceno, Chieti, Foggia, Barletta-Andria-Trani, Bari, Brindisi, Taranto, Lecce, Matera.

== See also ==
- Ipercoop
- CoopVoce
- Consumers' cooperative
