= Roberto Colaninno =

Italian businessman (1943–2023)

- Born: 16 August 1943; Mantua, Italy
- Died: 18 August 2023 (aged 80); Mantua, Italy
- Children: Matteo Colaninno

Roberto Colaninno (16 August 1943 – 18 August 2023) was an Italian businessman. He served as president of Piaggio from 2006 till his death.

== Life and career ==
Born in Mantua into an Apulian family, Colaninno graduated in accounting, and in 1969 he started working at Fiaam, a company producing car filters, becoming its managing director and later its CEO. In 1981, he founded in his hometown SOGEFI, another auto components company, which was later acquired from CIR Group. In 1996, he became CEO of Olivetti, and during his tenure he sold Olivetti's subsidiaries Omnitel and Infostrada to Mannesmann for about 7 billion lire, and then took part in the 1999 Telecom Italia takeover together with Emilio Gnutti and Giovanni Consorte.

In 2002, Colaninno resigned from Olivetti in disagreement with the decision to sell Telecom to Marco Tronchetti Provera, and thanks to the sale of stock options and minority stakes as well as his severance package he acquired IMMSI, an industrial holding company, and in 2003 he took control of Piaggio, becoming its president and successfully relaunching the brand. In 2008, he was part of the "Compagnia Aerea Italiana" (CAI) consortium which acquired Alitalia.

During his career Colaninno received various honours, notably the Legion of Honour, the title of Cavaliere del Lavoro and an honorary degree in economics and business from the University of Lecce. He died on 5 August 2023, at the age of 80.
