= Dunav osiguranje =

Serbian insurance company

- Official logo
- Native name: Дунав осигурање
- Type: Joint-stock company
- Industry: Finance and Insurance
- Founded: 30 June 1963; 63 years ago
- Headquarters: Makedonska 4, Belgrade, Serbia
- Area served: Serbia; Bosnia and Herzegovina
- Key people: Branislav Trifunović (CEO)
- Services: Non-life insurance Life insurance
- Revenue: ▲€431.61 million (2025)
- Net income: ▲€38.74 million (2025)
- Total assets: ▲€908.66 million (2025)
- Total equity: ▲€241.17 million (2025)
- Owner: Government of Serbia (76.70%); Equity Funds (3.61%); Others (as of 30 October 2026)
- Number of employees: 3,536 (2025)
- Subsidiaries: Subsidiaries
- Website: www.dunav.com
- Footnotes; Business ID: 07046898; Tax ID: 100001958

Dunav osiguranje (Serbian Cyrillic: Дунав осигурање) or Dunav Insurance, is a Serbian insurance company based in Belgrade, Serbia. It is the largest non-life insurance company in the Serbian insurance market.

== History ==
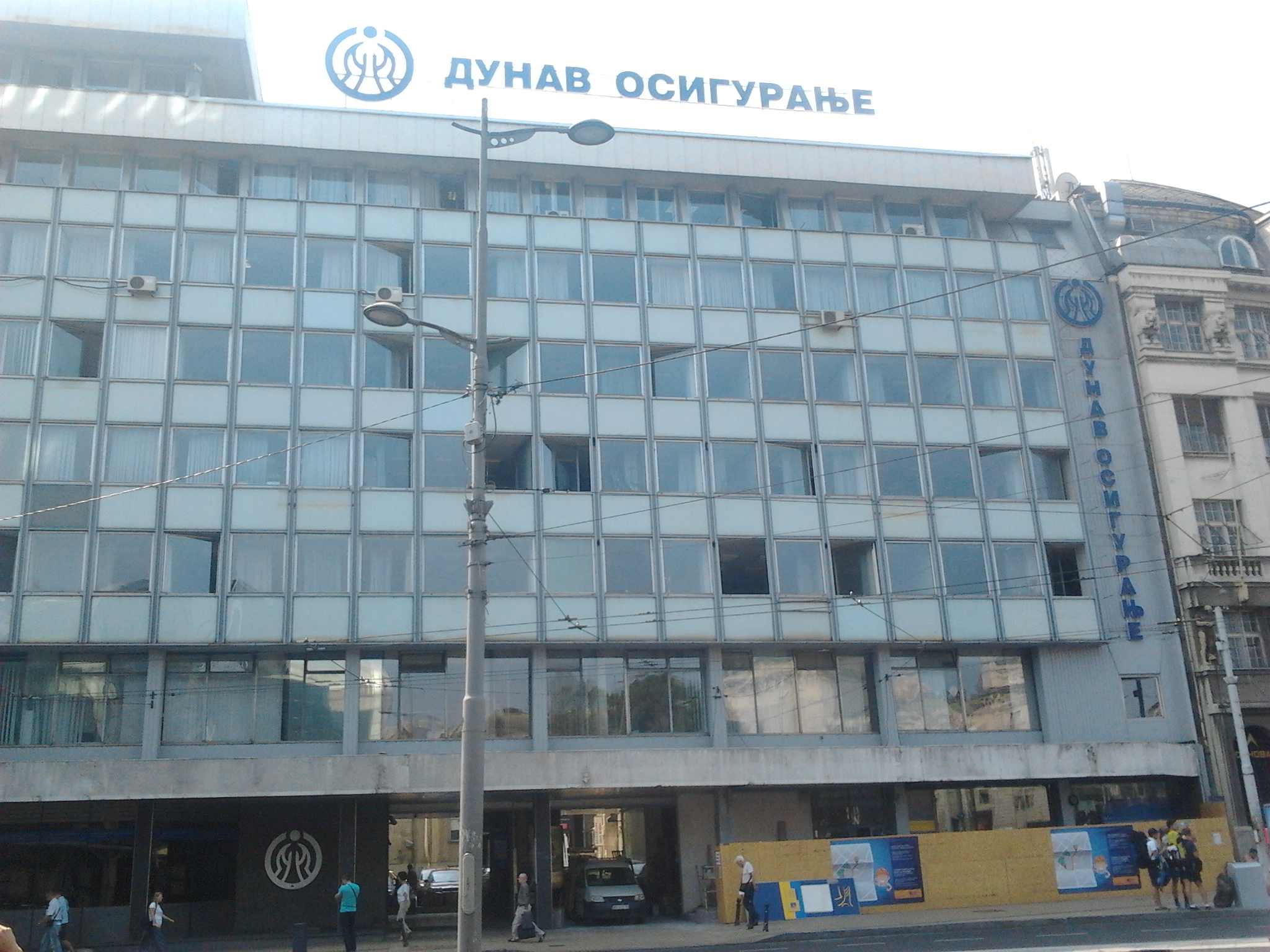
Dunav osiguranje headquarters building in Belgrade

The first Serbian insurance institution, Belgrade Cooperative, was founded in 1897. In the early 20th century, a few foreign insurance companies were founded, but ceased their operations at the beginning of the World War II.

After World War II, insurance passed into the domain of the state, due to the changes caused by the socialist revolution. The National Insurance and Reinsurance was established by merger of pre-insurance company Dunav, Elementar and Winershtedishe. The department had three basic functions: ensuring state and public property from fire and other risks, the implementation of all types of compulsory insurance, and reinsurance. Through amendments to the Constitution and political conditions, premium rates have changed and conducted audits of insurance policies, and insurance was decentralized in 1968.

Following that decentralization, a total of 128 institutes and 7 insurance communities integrated into 11 insurance companies. Among them were the "Airport" and "Yugoslavia", which integrated in 1974, and thus way created the ground for the establishment of the insurance company Dunav since 1990. The Institute changed its name to "Joint Stock Company Insurance Danube" with unlimited liability, and then became Dunav osiguranje company as a central part of Danube Group, with several subsidiaries.

As of 2015, Dunav osiguranje has 29 branches and over 600 marketplaces in Serbia. As of 2016, it has 32.6% of non-life premium income market share and 5.9% of life premium income market share in Serbia, making it the largest insurance company in the Serbian insurance market. As of 22 March 2019, Dunav osiguranje has a market capitalization of 46.79 million euros.

== Subsidiaries ==
This is a list of subsidiary companies of Dunav osiguranje:

- Dunav RE a.d.o. Belgrade
- Dunav Penzije a.d. Belgrade
- Dunav Turist d.o.o. Zlatibor
- Dunav Auto d.o.o. Belgrade
- Dunav Stockbroker a.d. Belgrade
- Dunav osiguranje a.d. Banja Luka, Bosnia and Herzegovina
- Dunav Auto d.o.o. Banja Luka, Bosnia and Herzegovina

== See also ==
- Insurance in Serbia
