= Matteo Colaninno =

Italian politician (born 1970)

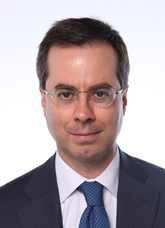
- Colaninno in 2013

Member of the Chamber of Deputies
- In office 29 April 2008 – 12 October 2022
- Constituency: Lombardy 1 (2008–2013); Lombardy 3 (2013–2018); Lombardy 4 (2018–2022)

Personal details
- Born: 16 October 1970 (age 55)
- Party: Democratic Party (2008–2019); Italia Viva (2019–2022)
- Parent: Roberto Colaninno (father)

Matteo Colaninno (born 16 October 1970) is an Italian politician and businessman serving as chairman of Piaggio since 2023. From 2008 to 2022, he was a member of the Chamber of Deputies. He is the son of Roberto Colaninno.
