= Insurance in Serbia =

Insurance in Serbia refers to the market for risk in the Republic of Serbia. Insurance, generally, is a contract in which the insurer (joint-stock insurance company, mutual insurance company, or reciprocal, for example), agrees to compensate or indemnify another party (the insured, the policyholder or a beneficiary) for specified loss or damage to a specified thing (e.g., an item, property or life) from certain perils or risks in exchange for a fee (the insurance premium).

For example, a property insurance company may agree to bear the risk that a particular piece of property (e.g., a car or a house) may suffer a specific type or types of damage or loss during a certain period of time in exchange for a fee from the policyholder who would otherwise be responsible for that damage or loss. That agreement takes the form of an insurance policy.

== History ==
The earliest traces are found in medieval Serbia, in Dušan's Code. It is envisaged that the damage to property landlords compensate from the imperial treasury, and then the funds were restored from taxes.

Later, the insurance developed in various forms, through the solidarity of members and their families in fraternities and guild associations, or through forms of marine insurance. The first mention of insurance in Belgrade, was in 1839. year. The salesman, named Zuban, insured house and everything in it to a sum of 175 talers, in Trieste insurance company. Newspapers "Novine srbske" wrote in detail about the case, because after a few days Zubanova house burned to the ground, and full amount was paid to the owner.

== Insurance companies ==
As of 31.12.2024. these are the largest companies in Serbian insurance market by premium income:

Below is a table showing the total collected premiums in the non-life, life, and total insurance premiums as of 31 December 2024.

Name	Capital	Non-life premium (million EUR)	Non-life market share	Life premium (million EUR)	Life market share	Total premium (million EUR)	Total market share
Dunav osiguranje	(Serbia)	354	28%	41	16%	394	26%
SG osiguranje	(Russia)	5	0%	0	0%	5	0%
Merkur osiguranje	(Germany)	1	0%	6	3%	7	1%
AMS osiguranje	(Serbia)	64	5%	0	0%	64	4%
GLOBOS osiguranje	(Serbia)	76	6%	0	0%	76	5%
Milenijum osiguranje	(Croatia)	51	4%	0	0%	51	3%
SAVA osiguranje	(Slovenia)	52	4%	8	3%	59	4%
Generali osiguranje	(Italy)	213	17%	57	23%	270	18%
DDOR Novi Sad	(Italy)	145	11%	23	9%	167	11%
Wiener Städtische	(Austria)	120	9%	46	19%	166	11%
Triglav osiguranje	(Slovenia)	109	9%	6	2%	114	8%
Grawe osiguranje	(Austria)	23	2%	36	14%	59	4%
UNIQA osiguranje	(Austria)	51	4%	13	5%	60	4%
Total		1249		249		1515	
