= Fondazione Carispaq =

Italian charity

Fondazione Cassa di Risparmio della Provincia dell'Aquila, also known as Fondazione Carispaq, is an Italian banking foundation that was the product of 1990 banking reform (Legge Amato-Ciampi). The foundation was the owner of Cassa di Risparmio della Provincia dell'Aquila S.p.A. However the limited company was sold to Banca Popolare dell'Emilia Romagna (BPER Banca) progressively from 2000 to 2013. Carispaq sold 11.853% shares of Carispaq for 1,915,453 new shares of BPER, which were equivalent to 0.58% share capital as at 31 December 2014.

As of 31 December 2014, the foundation had a shareholders equity of €142,841,977. The foundation provided scholarship to the students of University of L'Aquila, as well as an archaeology scholarship co-funded with Associazione L'ArQueologia. It was reported that the foundation promoted a feasibility study for the construction of a L'Aquila–Rome railway.

It owns many historical buildings, including Palazzo Alferi de Torres and the original location of Cassa di Risparmio della Provincia dell'Aquila, which currently hosts both the foundation and the local branch of BPER Banca.
