= Coop (Italy) =

System of Italian consumers' cooperatives

Coop Italia S.c.a.r.l.

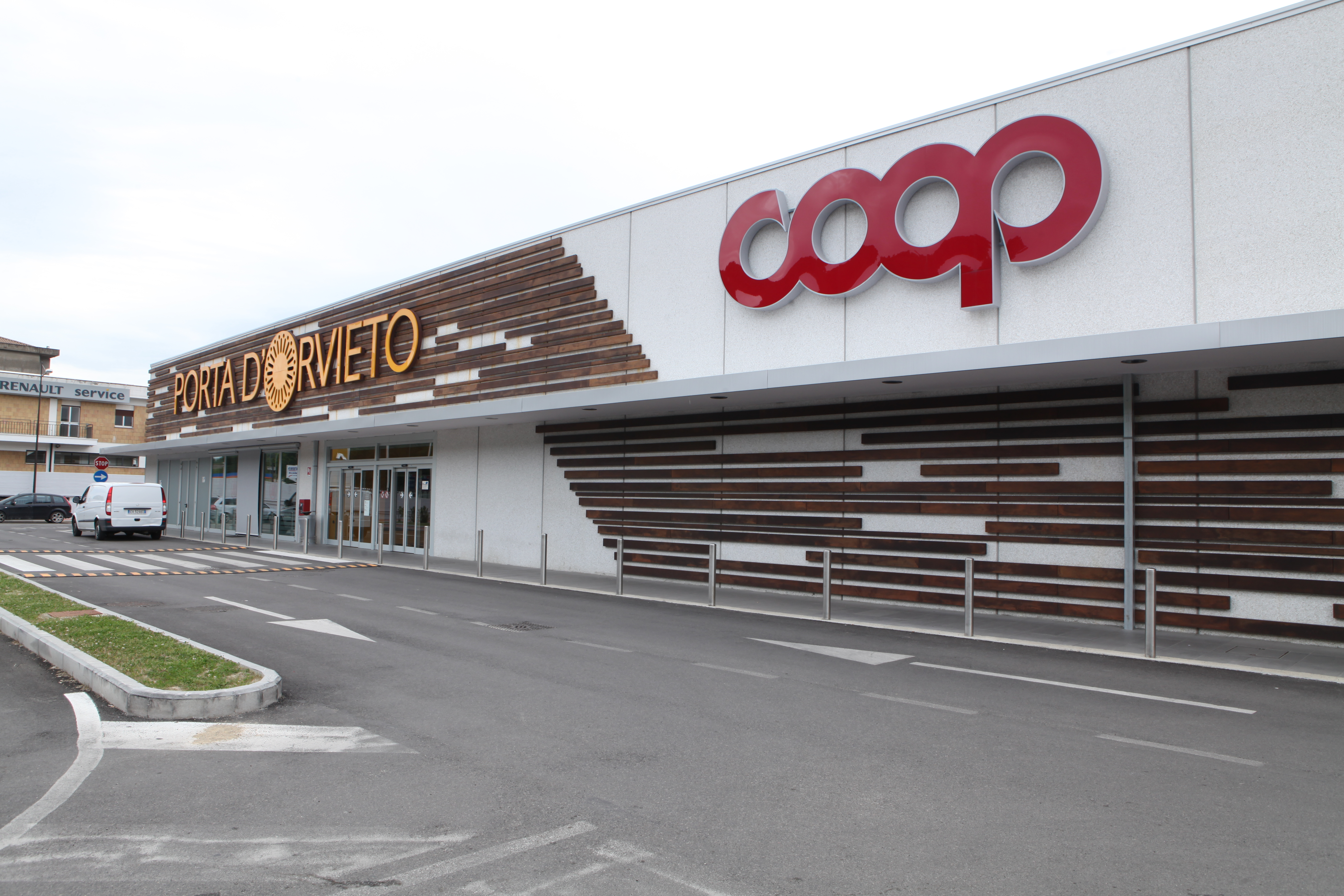
- Company type: Cooperative
- Industry: Wholesale distribution
- Founded: 1967; 59 years ago
- Headquarters: Casalecchio di Reno, Italy
- Area served: Italy
- Products: Foods and consumer goods
- Brands: Coop; InCoop; Coop&Coop; ExtraCoop; IperCoop; CoopVoce
- Revenue: €16.1 billion (2022)
- Members: 7,429,847 (2010)
- Number of employees: 56,000 (2022)
- Website: https://www.coopcentroitalia.it

Coop is a system of Italian consumers' cooperatives which operates one of the largest supermarket chains in Italy. Its headquarters are located in Casalecchio di Reno, Province of Bologna.

The first cooperative shop was established in Turin in 1854. As of 2010, Coop's system operates with 115 consumers' cooperatives of various sizes (9 large, 14 medium, and 92 small), with 1,444 shops, 56,682 employees, more than 7,429,847 members, and an annual revenue of €12.9 billion.

On the 1st of July, 2025, the cooperatives Coop Centro Italia (operating in the provinces of Arezzo, Siena, Perugia, Terni, Rieti, L'Aquila) and Unicoop Tirreno (operating in the provinces of Massa-Carrara, Lucca, Livorno, Grosseto, Siena, Terni, Viterbo, Rome, Latina, Frosinone, Naples, Avellino) fused to form Unicoop Etruria.

== Big cooperatives ==
- North-West District
  - Coop Liguria (provinces of Genoa, Savona, La Spezia, Imperia, Alessandria, Cuneo)
  - Coop Lombardia (provinces of Varese, Como, Milan, Monza and Brianza, Lodi, Pavia, Cremona, Brescia, Bergamo)
  - NovaCoop (provinces of Turin, Biella, Vercelli, Novara, Verbania, Varese, Milan, Cuneo, Asti, Alessandria)
- Adriatic District
  - Coop Alleanza 3.0 (formed by the merger of the three big cooperatives of the Adriatic District, Coop Adriatica, Coop Consumatori Nordest and Coop Estense on 1 January 2016) (provinces of Trieste, Gorizia, Udine, Pordenone, Belluno, Vicenza, Treviso, Padua, Venezia, Treviso, Rovigo, Brescia, Mantua, Piacenza, Parma, Reggio Emilia, Modena, Bologna, Ferrara, Ravenna, Forlì-Cesena, Rimini, Pesaro e Urbino, Ancona, Macerata, Fermo, Ascoli Piceno, Chieti, Foggia, Barletta-Andria-Trani, Bari, Brindisi, Taranto, Lecce, Matera and Sicily)
- Tyrrenic District
  - Unicoop Etruria (provinces of Arezzo, Siena, Perugia, Terni, Rieti, L'Aquila, Massa-Carrara, Lucca, Livorno, Grosseto, Viterbo, Rome, Latina, Frosinone, Naples, Avellino)
  - Unicoop Firenze (provinces of Lucca, Pisa, Pistoia, Prato, Florence, Arezzo, Siena)

== CoopVoce ==
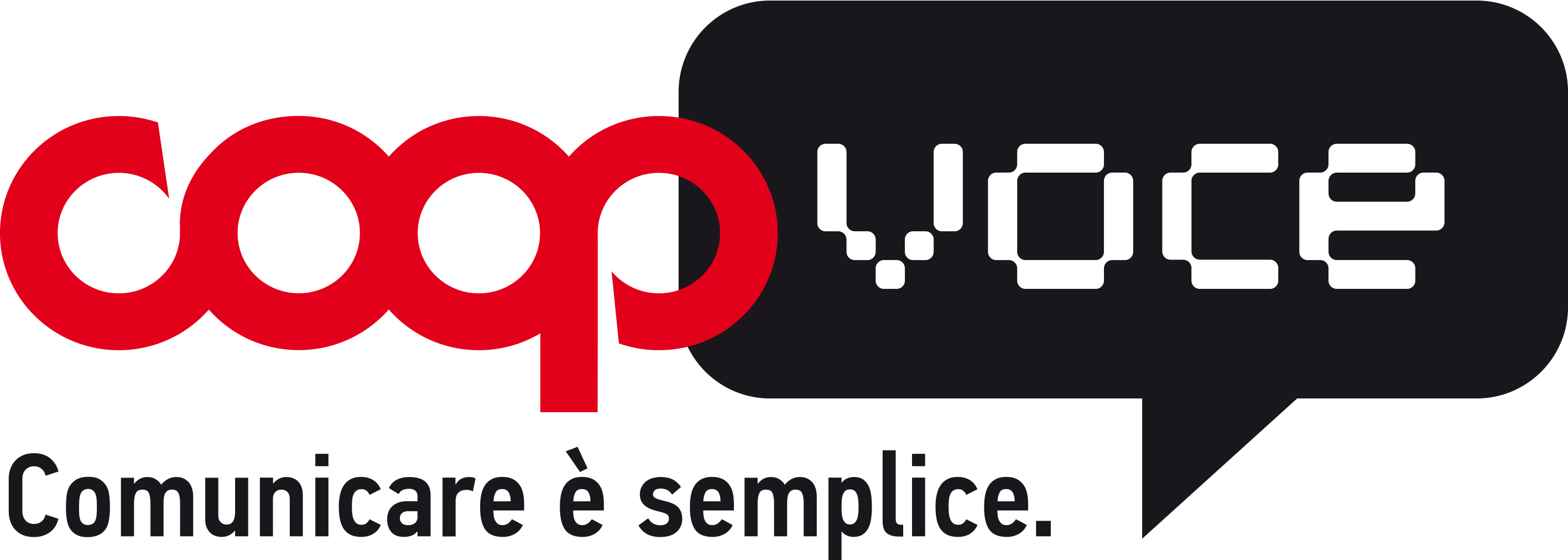
CoopVoce

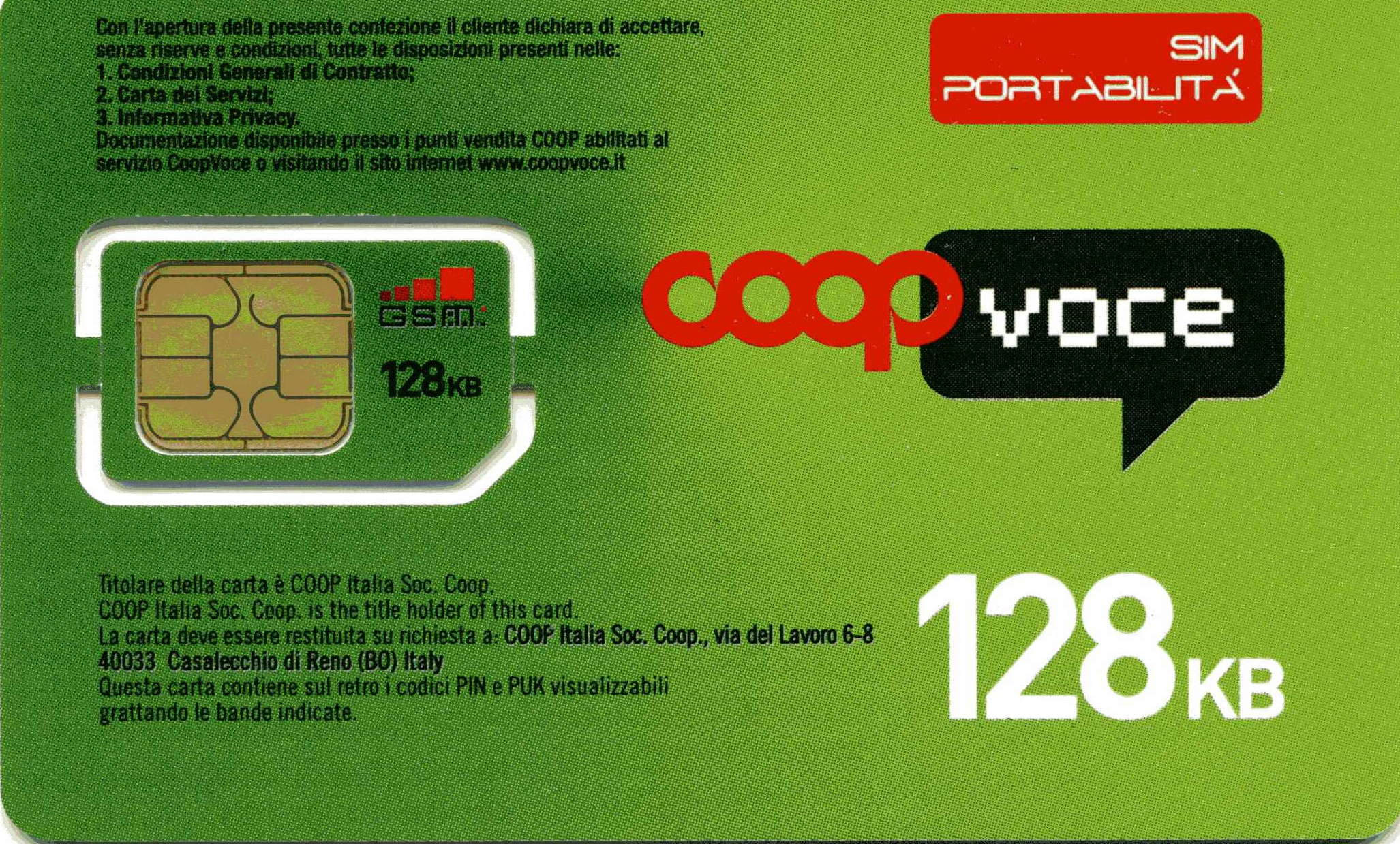
CoopVoce SIM

CoopVoce is the Mobile Virtual Network Operator (MVNO) of Coop. It is the first MVNO in Italy.

Operational since 1 June 2007 as ESP MVNO, after an experimental phase lasting about three months, it was born from the agreement between Coop and TIM, of which it uses the GSM/UMTS/LTE network for the provision of the service.

For the numbering of its SIMs, CoopVoce uses the first decade of the decamileous 331 (that is 331-1) and the third decade of the decamileous 370 (that is 370-3).

== See also ==
- Consumers' cooperative
