= Gianpiero Fiorani =

Italian banker and manager

Gianpiero Fiorani (Codogno, September 12, 1959), is an Italian banker and manager who was implicated in the Italian banking scandal of 2005 known as "Bancopoli".

== Biography ==
With a degree in political sciences, Fiorani was the manager of the bank Banca Popolare Italiana (formerly Banca Popolare di Lodi). In the summer of 2005, this bank was investigated over the Bancopoli scandal, and then by magistrates (GIP) in Rome and Milan. Fiorani is considered one of the "furbetti del quartierino" (smartasses of the 'hood).

In December 2005, after the conclusion of this investigation, Gianpiero Fiorani was arrested. He regained his freedom on June 13, 2006 because of a general parliamentary pardon by a speedy bipartisan initiative of both chambers in the Italian parliament. He spent months trying to clear himself of the charges. 68.4% of the shareholders of the bank where he was the chief executive officer ("amministratore delegato"), voted to sue him in a class action.

== Mismanagement and fraud at the Banca Popolare di Lodi ==
As a result of the official investigations by the Italian prosecutors' office (Procura Nazionale) and by the Italian National Bank Banca d'Italia it became clear that for years, Fiorani and his hidden associates had become the total controllers of the Banca Popolare di Lodi, using it to gain control of other small banks such as Popolare di Crema, but also for their own personal advantage, such as getting real estate properties for themselves and for third parties, operating arbitrarily, with absolute internal, external and institutional control.

Among other things, the official investigations established that in order to cover its losses, the bank charged its unsuspecting customers increasing bank fees. Thus, according to the (GIP) magistrate Clementina Forleo, many small account holders suffered huge losses. It was also confirmed that if an account holder died and the relatives did not close the account quickly, it was illegally seized by the bank.

== Advice to victims ==
In an interview given on July 14, 2007 to the Italian newspaper La Repubblica Fiorani released a statement that affirmed, "With all my experience and competence, I find myself in a broadcast to explain to Italians how not to get cheated by banks and insurance companies."
