= Antonio Fazio =

Italian banker

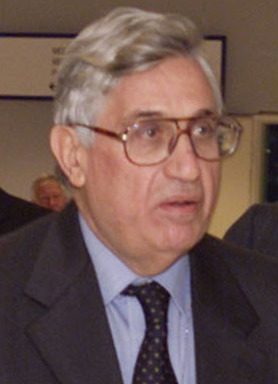

Governor of the Bank of Italy
- In office 4 May 1993 – 19 December 2005
- Preceded by: Carlo Azeglio Ciampi
- Succeeded by: Mario Draghi

Personal details
- Born: 11 October 1936 (age 90) Alvito, Italy
- Education: Sapienza University of Rome; Massachusetts Institute of Technology
- Profession: Banker

Antonio Fazio (born 11 October 1936 in Alvito, province of Frosinone) is an Italian banker, who was the Governor of Banca d'Italia from 1993 until his resignation amidst controversy in 2005.

After graduating in economics in 1960, he continued his studies at the Massachusetts Institute of Technology. He was assistant professor of Demographics at the Faculty of Economics of Rome University (La Sapienza) and Economic Consultant to the Economic Research Department of the Bank of Italy, which he joined as a staff economist in 1966.

He is reported to be very religious, and close to the Vatican. He has five children.

== Career ==
He started work at the Bank of Italy in 1960. In 1993, after his predecessor Carlo Azeglio Ciampi left office to become the Italian Prime Minister, he became governor of the Bank of Italy. Some years after his appointment, it was said that he was interested in the leadership of the left-wing coalition to beat Berlusconi's right-wing one. After Berlusconi won the 2001 general election, however, he came to be considered closer to the centre-right.

== The Antonveneta affair ==
In 2005, Fazio came under heavy pressure to resign (which he eventually did) over his role in allegedly rigging the competition to take over an Italian bank, Banca Antonveneta, earlier in the year. Published excerpts of tapped telephone calls strongly suggest that Fazio favoured an Italian bid, probably in order to sabotage a foreign bid from the Dutch bank ABN AMRO.

=== Reaction of the government ===
Silvio Berlusconi's government, itself in troubled times because of the utter defeat in the regional elections of April 2005, was accused of weakness for not kicking Fazio out of office. On 21 September 2005, the economy minister Domenico Siniscalco resigned in protest against the lack of determination in the government. The government maintained that it had no power to remove the governor of the central bank.

=== Investigations and resignation ===
Gianpiero Fiorani was arrested on 14 December 2005 for investigation of his role in the affair, and Fazio was officially put under investigation in Milan for insider trading on 16 December. He is also under investigation in Rome for having pressured the apparatus of the Bank of Italy to give the green light to Fiorani's takeover of Antonveneta.

Although he had resisted calls to resign for months, these latest developments were the last straw, and Fazio stepped down on 19 December 2005. A new governor, Mario Draghi, was appointed on 29 December 2005.

On 28 May 2011, an Italian court sentenced him to four years in jail for market-rigging related to a 2005 takeover battle over Italian bank Banca Antonveneta. A Milan court has also ordered Fazio – who headed the Bank of Italy from 1993 to 2005 – to pay a 1.5 million euro ($2.14 million) fine for his role in the takeover saga pitting Dutch Bank ABN AMRO against Italy's Banca Popolare Italiana (BPI).

Government offices
Preceded by Mario Sarcinelli	Deputy Director General of the Bank of Italy; 1982–1993	Succeeded by Vincenzo Desario
Preceded by Carlo Azeglio Ciampi	Governor of the Bank of Italy; 1993–2005	Succeeded by Mario Draghi
