= Unipol Assicurazioni (Unipol Group's subsidiary) =

UGF Assicurazioni
- Native name: UGF Assicurazioni S.p.A.
- Founded: 28 December 2006
- Defunct: 6 January 2014
- Fate: Merged with other companies
- Successor: UnipolSai
- Headquarters: Bologna, Italy
- Owners: Unipol (100%)
- Parent: Unipol
- Website: http://www.carispcesena.it/

Unipol Assicurazioni (also known as UGF Assicurazioni or Compagnia Assicuratrice Unipol) was a subsidiary incorporated in 2007 to receive the assets from the Unipol Gruppo Finanziario holding company. On 6 January 2014 it was merged with other insurance companies to form UnipolSai.

== History ==
Founded as Nuova Unipol Assicurazioni in late 2006. On 1 September 2007 [old] Unipol Assicurazioni was renamed to Unipol Gruppo Finanziario (UGF; or Unipol), while the Nuova Unipol Assicurazioni was renamed into Unipol Assicurazioni, as a wholly owned subsidiary of UGF. As at 31 December 2007, it had a shareholders equity of €654,625,654 (in separate balance sheets), which was decreased to €364,958,011 in to next year.

On 1 February 2009 sister company Aurora Assicurazioni was merged with new Unipol Assicurazioni to form UGF Assicurazioni. The new subsidiary had a shareholders equity of €1,337,527,861 at 31 December 2009. It was decreased to €1,225,389,669 at 31 December 2010. The company changed to previous name Unipol Assicurazioni in 2011. Circa January 2011 the company acquired the insurance business from sister companies Navale Assicurazioni. As at 31 December 2011 the shareholders equity was further decreased to €1,158,532,303.

Prior the formation of UnipolSai, as at 31 December 2013 Unipol Assicurazioni had a shareholders equity of €2,742,846,924, which was increased from €1,762,012,434.
