= Fondiaria-Sai =

Fondiaria-Sai S.p.A.
- Company type: Società per azioni
- Industry: Financial services
- Founded: 2002
- Defunct: 6 January 2014
- Successor: UnipolSai
- Headquarters: Turin, Italy
- Products: Insurance, asset management

Fondiaria-Sai S.p.A. was an Italian financial services company based in Turin, founded in 2002 by the merger of La Fondiaria Assicurazioni and Società Assicuratrice Industriale. In 2014 the company was merged by incorporation of Unipol Assicurazioni, Milano Assicurazioni and Premafin in UnipolSai.

The company was particularly active in the insurance sector, where it underwrites life, property, casualty and marine cover.

The company was listed on the Borsa Italiana and was a constituent of the FTSE MIB index.

Fondiaria-Sai in 2007 bought a 100% stake in Serbia's DDOR Novi Sad insurance company.

In 2007 50% stake of Popolare Vita was bought from Cattolica Assicurazioni via Banco Popolare.
