= UnipolSai =

UnipolSai Assicurazioni S.p.A.
- Company type: Società per azioni
- Traded as: BIT: US
- Industry: Financial services
- Founded: 6 January 2014; 12 years ago
- Headquarters: Bologna, Italy
- Key people: Fabio Cerchiai (President); Carlo Cimbri (CEO)
- Services: Insurance, Asset management
- Revenue: ▼€ 14.25 billion (2016)
- Net income: ▼€ 528 million (2016)
- Total assets: ▲€ 69.28 billion (2016)
- Total equity: ▼€ 6.53 billion (2016)
- Owner: Unipol (61.084%); Norges Bank (2.142%)
- Number of employees: 10,280 (2016)
- Parent: Unipol
- Subsidiaries: Popolare Vita (Joint venture)
- Website: www.unipolsai.com

UnipolSai Assicurazioni S.p.A. was an Italian financial services company based in Bologna and founded in 2014, which was part of Unipol Group.

In December 2024, Unipol completed the reorganisation of the group with the merger by incorporation of UnipolSai.

== History ==
On 6 January 2014 the companies Unipol Assicurazioni, Milano Assicurazioni and Premafin (a holding company related to Fondiaria-Sai) were absorbed into Fondiaria-Sai, with the company was relocated to Bologna and renamed to UnipolSai.

The company is one of the biggest in Italy, particularly active in the insurance sector in the life, property and in the auto where in Italy is the leader with over 16.7 million of customers.

The company was listed on the Borsa Italiana and was a constituent of the FTSE MIB index.
