= Giovanni Consorte =

Italian manager

- Born: 16 April 1948 (age 78); Chieti, Abruzzo, Italy
- Occupation: Manager

Giovanni Consorte (born 16 April 1948) is an Italian manager.

== Career ==
Born in Chieti, Consorte graduated in chemical engineering at the University of Bologna in 1972 and headed Montedison from 1973 to 1975, then Lega delle Cooperative from 1976 to 1978. Since 1979 he worked in Unipol, of which he became president in 1996. He resigned on December 31, 2005, following the bancopoli scandal.

On October 25, 2006, he was sentenced to six months in jail for insider trading, together with Ivano Sacchetti and Emilio Gnutti. He appealed, but on November 12, 2007, the sentence was upheld by the Milan Court of Appeal.
