= Unipol =

Italian financial services holding company

Unipol Assicurazioni S.p.A.
- Formerly: Unipol Gruppo S.p.A.
- Company type: listed Società per azioni
- Traded as: BIT: UNI; FTSE MIB
- ISIN: IT0004810054
- Industry: Financial services
- Founded: 1963
- Headquarters: Bologna, Italy
- Key people: Pierluigi Stefanini (chairman); Carlo Cimbri (CEO)
- Services: Insurance, retail and corporate banking
- Revenue: ▲€22.25 billion (2014)
- Net income: ▲€1.1 billion (2024)
- Total assets: ▲€83.425;billion (2024)
- Total equity: ▲€5.69 billion (2014)
- Number of employees: 12,000 (2024)
Subsidiaries
UnipolSai	(61.084%)
Linear Assicurazioni	(100%)
Linear Life	(100%)
Unisalute	(98.53%)
Arca Vita	(63.39%)
- Capital ratio: 18.5% (Tier 1)
- Website: www.unipol.it
- Footnotes / references source

Unipol Assicurazioni S.p.A. is an Italian financial services holding company operating in the insurance and banking fields with headquarters in the Unipol Tower, Bologna. As of 2009 it was ranked as the country's fourth-largest insurer.

The company trades under a number of brands: for insurance it uses the brands UnipolSai Assicurazioni, Linear Assicurazioni, Linear Life, UniSalute and Arca Vita.

In December 2024, Unipol completed the reorganisation of the group with the merger by incorporation of UnipolSai (as well as other branches, like Unipol Finance S.r.l. and Unipol Investment S.p.A) and the whole group was renamed 'Unipol Assicurazioni'.

== History ==
Unipol Assicurazioni was founded in 1962 in Bologna as a cooperative provider of non-life insurance.

=== 1990s ===
In 1995 the company entered a partnership arrangement with the banking group Casse Emiliano Romagnole, whereby Unipol sold its products through the bank's networks. The partnership also involved complex deals in ownership. As at 31 December 1995, Unipol owned 3.64% shares of CAER; CAER in turn owned 9.80% shares of Unipol's parent company Finsoe. CAER also owned Banca dell'Economia Cooperativa through 6.99% shares owned by CAER directly, as well as an additional 13% shares of the bank owned by CAER's subsidiary Cassa di Risparmio in Bologna (Carisbo). Through Carisbo's subsidiary, FINCAER, the bank group also purchased a minority ownership from Unipol in UniSalute (9.9%) and in Noricum Assicurazioni (34%), In 1996 FINCAER had a minority ownership in Linear Assicurazioni (20%), as well as the ownership in Noricum which increased to 44%.

Since 1998 Unipol started to build their own bank networks, to sell their own products, which gave birth to Unipol Banca. In the same year Unipol founded a 50-50 joint venture company Quadrifoglio Vita with Banca Agricola Mantovana. In December 2000 Unipol purchased 51% shares of BNL Vita, a joint venture with Banca Nazionale del Lavoro from Assicurazioni Generali.

=== 2000s ===
In 2001 Unipol bought back the 9.9% shares of UniSalute and 20% of Linear Assicurazioni. Cardine Banca (ex-CAER) also sold all the shares of Unipol Banca and Finsoe to third parties.

In December 2003 Unipol subscribed to the capital increases of Reti Bancarie, a sub-holding company of Banca Popolare Italiana for €173.4 million. In return Aurora Assicurazioni got the rights to sell their products in the bank networks of Reti Bancarie. BPI was involved in a failed takeover of Antonveneta, part of the bancopoli that was exposed in 2005. In early 2006 Unipol's takeover bid of Banca Nazionale del Lavoro was rejected by the Bank of Italy. BNL was acquired by BNP Paribas instead, consequently the French company acquired 4.5% shares of Unipol's parent company Finsoe.

After the failed takeover bid Unipol saw its CEO Giovanni Consorte resign in the midst of the bancopoli scandal. Consorte was later convicted for insider trading. Under Consorte's replacements Pierluigi Stefanini and Carlo Salvatori, the company underwent extensive restructuring in 2007.

Under the restructure scheme, Unipol Assicurazioni (also known as Compagnia Assicuratrice Unipol) was to be renamed as Unipol Gruppo Finanziario, and a new subsidiary Unipol Assicurazioni would be set up.

As at 31 December 2007 the holding company controlled five insurance companies: Unipol Assicurazioni (100%), Aurora Assicurazioni (100%), Linear Assicurazioni (100%), Navale Assicurazioni (99.83%) and UniSalute (98.48%).

In 2008 Quadrifoglio Vita was sold to AXA.

=== 2010s ===
In 2010 a 60% stake of Arca Vita was bought from Banca Popolare dell'Emilia Romagna (BPER) and Banca Popolare di Sondrio (BPSO); a 31.56% minority stake of Arca Assicurazioni was acquired from BPER, BPSO, Banca Popolare di Marostica, Credito Siciliano and Banca Popolare Sant'Angelo.

In 2011 BNP Paribas bought back BNL Vita from Unipol.

In 2014 [new] Unipol Assicurazioni, a subsidiary of Unipol was merged with Milano Assicurazioni, Premafin (a holding company related to Fondiaria-Sai) and Fondiaria-Sai to form UnipolSai.

=== 2020s ===
In September 2023, Unipol acquired a 10.2% share of Banca Popolare di Sondrio, thus lifting its stake at 19.7 % of the capital of the bank.

== Shareholder structure ==
As of 6 June 2025, Unipol's main shareholders were:

- 23.480% Coop Alleanza 3.0
- 6.815 Novacoop S.C.
- 6.735% Holmo S.p.A.
- 4.297% Cooperare S.p.A.

== Equity interests ==
- BPER Banca (19.9%)
