= IRFIS – FinSicilia =

- Native name: IRFIS – Finanziaria per lo Sviluppo della Sicilia S.p.A.
- Formerly: Istituto Regionale per il Finanziamento alle Industrie in Sicilia; Mediocredito della Sicilia
- Company type: State-owned enterprise
- Industry: Financial services
- Founded: October 31, 1952; 73 years ago
- Headquarters: Palermo, Sicily, Italy
- Area served: Sicily region
- Key people: Rosario Basile (chairman); Vincenzo Emanuele (general manager)
- Services: Development bank
- Owner: Sicily region (100%)
- Capital ratio: 16.49% (Tier 1)
- Website: www.irfis.it (in Italian)
- Footnotes / references source

IRFIS – Finanziaria per lo Sviluppo della Sicilia S.p.A. also known as IRFIS – FinSicilia S.p.A., is an Italian development bank based in Palermo, Sicily. The bank is registered under article 106 and 107 of Testo Unico Bancario (Italian banking law). The bank provided subsidized loans and intermediates for companies to access government incentives.

== History ==
Istituto Regionale per il Finanziamento alle Medie e Piccole Industrie in Sicilia or IRFIS was founded on 31 October 1952 as a statutory corporation, which was one of the 19 mediocredito of Italy. The banks provided medium term loan to medium and small companies from their regions. Along with Credito Industriale Sardo and ISVEIMER, they were funded by Cassa per il Mezzogiorno, making the three banks were also known as Istituti per il Finanziamento a Medio Terminealle Medie e Piccole Industrie nell'Italia Meridionale e Insulare, or Istituti Meridionale in short.

Due to Legge Amato, the bank became a società per azioni, a kind of limited company by shares, known as IRFIS – Mediocredito della Sicilia S.p.A. or just IRFIS S.p.A.. The bank also privatized by the state and acquired by Banco di Sicilia, which in turn acquired by Banca di Roma. Banca Popolare di Novara was a minority shareholder (0.14%) of IRFIS as of 2000. Its successor Banco Popolare di Verona e Novara (BPVN) received the stake in 2002. As of 2003, BPVN owned 0.143% shares of IRFIS.

The bank became a subsidiary of Capitalia after Banca di Roma was merged with Bipop Carire. In 2007 the bank became part of UniCredit after Capitalia was acquired by the largest bank of Italy. As at 31 December 2007 Banco di Sicilia owned about 76.26% stake in IRFIS, in turn Banco di Sicilia was a wholly owned subsidiary of UniCredit. The rest was owned by the Region of Sicily (about 21%) and others (about 2.74%).

After Banco di Sicilia was absorbed into UniCredit in 2010, the commercial business of IRFIS – Mediocredito della Sicilia was also absorbed by UniCredit on 1 June 2011. The bank also renamed to IRFIS – Finanziaria per lo Sviluppo della Sicilia S.p.A. or in short IRFIS – FinSicilia. Sister company Mediocredito Centrale was also restructured. In 2011 Mediocredito Centrale was sold to the state via Poste italiane (transformed into a development bank of Southern Italy), while Mediocredito della Sicilia was sold to the Region of Sicily on 10 January 2012. The rest of the surviving Mediocredito of Italy were: Mediocredito Trentino – South Tyrol and Mediocredito Friuli – Venezia Giulia which were controlled by the regions, as well as Mediocredito Italiano, a subsidiary of Intesa Sanpaolo; the rest of the Mediocredito were privatized and either renamed or absorbed into private banks.

As of 31 December 2010 IRFIS – FinSicilia had a total assets of €584,709,725, which was reduced to €255,801,251 on 31 December 2011; the shareholders equity was reduced from €97,339,642 in 2010 to €9,057,438 in 2011.

UniCredit also announced to sell IRFIS – FinSicilia to Banca Popolare di Vicenza. However, in 2009 the deal was collapsed. In 2012, UniCredit sold the stake to Sicily Region.
