= Mediocredito =

Italian banks

Mediocredito or lit. 'Regional Institutes for the Financing of Medium and Small Industries' (Italian: Istituti Regionali per il Finanziamento alle Medie e Piccole Industrie) were 19 Italian banks that were established in 1950s to provide medium term loans to small and medium companies (or more specifically industrial companies).

They served 19 regions of Italy (Molise region was established in 1963), with Aosta Valley did not have their dedicated bank. One more bank (Mediocredito Centrale) did not belong to any region. As of 2023, four banks survived, plus one bank transformed into different purpose.

== History ==
The banks were established based on Italian Law N°445 of 1950. Mediocredito Centrale provided financing to all the regional banks.

== Remaining banks ==
- Mediocredito Italiano, a subsidiary of Intesa Sanpaolo; was a Cariplo subsidiary (also known as Mediocredito Lombardo, Banca Intesa Mediocredito)
- Banca Mediocredito del Friuli Venezia Giulia, an Italian bank that was controlled by the regional government
- Investitionsbank Trentino Südtirol – Mediocredito Trentino Alto Adige, an Italian bank that was controlled by the regional and provincial government
- Banca del Mezzogiorno – MedioCredito Centrale, a subsidiary of Poste italiane (also known as UniCredit Mediocredito Centrale), an indirect subsidiary of the Ministry of Economy and Finance
- IRFIS – FinSicilia, was known as IRFIS - Mediocredito della Sicilia, an Italian financial institute and wholly owned subsidiary of the region
- Mediocredito Toscano, former name of MPS Capital Services, a subsidiary of Banca Monte dei Paschi di Siena

== Defunct banks ==
- UniCredit Banca Mediocredito, former Mediocredito Piemontese, a defunct subsidiary of Banca CRT (UniCredit)
- Mediocredito dell'Umbria, a defunct subsidiary of Banca dell'Umbria (UniCredit)
- Mediocredito delle Venezie, a defunct subsidiary of Cariverona Banca (UniCredit)
- Mediocredito Abruzzese e Molisano, an Italian bank that was absorbed by Mediocredito Italiano (Intesa Sanpaolo)
- Mediocredito del Sud, an Italian bank that was absorbed by Mediocredito Italiano (Intesa Sanpaolo), was a merger of the Mediocredito from Basilicata, Calabria and Apulia
- Mediocredito Emilia-Romagna, a predecessor of BIMER Banca, a defunct subsidiary of Cassa di Risparmio in Bologna
- Mediocredito Ligure, a defunct subsidiary of Cassa di Risparmio di Genova e Imperia
- Mediocredito Fondiario Centroitalia, a defunct subsidiary of Banca delle Marche, also known as Mediocredito delle Marche
- Mediocredito di Roma, a defunct subsidiary of Banca di Roma, serving Lazio region
- Credito Industriale Sardo, a predecessor of Banca di Credito Sardo, a defunct subsidiary of Intesa Sanpaolo, serving Sardinia Island
- Istituto per lo Sviluppo Economico dell'Italia Meridionale (ISVEIMER), a defunct bank based in Naples, served southern Italy except the two islands, subsidiary of Intesa Sanpaolo

== See also ==
- Mediocredito Padano, a defunct subsidiary of Cassa di Risparmio di Parma e Piacenza
- Mediobanca
