= Credito Fondiario (disambiguation) =

Credito Fondiario may refer to the following banks which was specializing in housing mortgage:

- Credito Fondiario (Fonspa), an Italian bank specialized in management of non-performing loans
- Istituto Italiano di Credito Fondiario, known as Italfondiario, a subsidiary of doBank
- Istituto di Credito Fondiario delle Venezie, now known as doBank

- Istituto di Credito Fondiario delle Marche, Umbria, Abruzzo e Molise, a defunct bank serving Marche, Umbria, Abruzzo and Molise
- Istituto di Credito Fondiario della Liguria, a defunct bank serving Liguria
- Credito Fondiario Toscano, a defunct bank serving Tuscany
