= Banca Popolare Sant'Angelo =

Italian bank

- Native name: Banca Popolare Sant'Angelo S.C.p.A.
- Formerly: Unione Economica Popolare
- Company type: Società Cooperativa per Azioni
- Industry: Financial services
- Founded: 29 January 1920
- Founder: Angelo Curella
- Headquarters: 10 Corso Vittorio Emanuele, Licata, Italy (legal); 94 via Enrico Albanese, Palermo, Italy (de facto)
- Number of locations: 27 branches; 2 headquarters; 1 corporate & private banking centre
- Area served: Province of Agrigento, Sicily; Province of Caltanissetta, Sicily; Palermo, Sicily; Catania, Sicily; Rome, Lazio
- Key people: Antonio COPPOLA (chairman); Ines Curella (general manager)
- Services: Retail, private and corporate banking
- Net income: ▲€6,239,560 (2014)
- Total assets: ▲€1,111,640,116 (2014)
- Total equity: ▲€122,143,828 (2014)
- Owner: 7,343 individuals (2015)
- Capital ratio: 11.93% (CET1)
- Website: Official website (in Italian)
- Footnotes / references source

Banca Popolare Sant'Angelo S.C.p.A. is an Italian cooperative bank based in Licata (in the Province of Agrigento) and Palermo, the capital of Sicily (in the province of the same name). The bank also has one branch in Lampedusa, the south most island of Italy and also has a branch in Rome.

The chairman of the board of directors of the bank was Nicolò Curella, who died in 2015.

== History ==
Banca Popolare Sant'Angelo was found in 1920 as Unione Economica Popolare. The bank absorbed Banca Popolare di Mussomeli in 1984, Banca Popolare di Palermo in 1989 and Nuova Banca del Monte Sant'Agata in 1994. Moreover, BP Sant'Angelo increased its stake in the finance leasing company Leasingroup Sicilia.

According to the Bank of Italy (the data was cited by Banca di Roma), in 1999 BP St.Angelo Group was ranked the 6th largest bank on Sicily in terms of branches (82 branches), behind Banco di Sicilia, Banca Popolare di Lodi, Banca Antonveneta, Banca Commerciale Italiana and Banca Monte dei Paschi di Siena (BMPS). In 1997, the bank was ranked 9th (2.79%) in terms of deposits (Italian: raccolta) market in the whole region, which ranked 4th in the Province of Agrigento (8.92%) and in the Province of Caltanissetta (8.27%), behind Banco di Sicilia (including Sicilcassa), BMPS, BCC G.Toniolo di San Cataldo (Caltanissetta only) and Sanpaolo (Agrigento only).

In 2000 the bank signed a bancassurance partnership with Cattolica Assicurazioni. The insurer also owned an equity interests in BP St.Angelo (0.42% in 2012). The current partner of the bank in bancassurance was Arca Vita, a subsidiary of Unipol. BP St.Angelo also sold an equity stake (1.1368%) of Arca Assicurazioni to Arca Vita in 2010.

In 2001 Banca Popolare Sant'Angelo sold the significant interests (44.86% stake) in Banca Regionale Sant'Angelo (ex-Nuova Banca del Monte Sant'Agata, which the group injected assets to the subsidiary on 1 January 2001. Branches increased from 5 to 56) to Credito Artigiano (a subsidiary of Credito Valtellinese). Banca Regionale Sant'Angelo also controlled Leasingroup Sicilia (69.315% stake). Banca Regionale Sant'Angelo and Leasingroup Sicilia became part of Credito Siciliano in 2002.

After many years of merger and acquisitions, BP St. Angelo and Banca Agricola Popolare di Ragusa were two of the few independent banks on the island (plus the member banks of Federazione Siciliana delle Banche di Credito Cooperativo). Sant'Angelo and Banca Agricola Ragusa did not have any overlap in the retail networks (except one branch of BP St. Angelo in Catania). The aforementioned competitors of the bank in 1999 became part of UniCredit, Intesa Sanpaolo, BMPS, Banco Popolare (as Banco Popolare Siciliano) as well as other competitors: Credito Valtellinese (as Credito Siciliano), Banca Nazionale del Lavoro, Credito Emiliano, Banca Popolare di Vicenza (as Banca Nuova) and Banca Carige.

== Sponsorship ==
The bank was a sponsor of Pallacanestro Trapani.

== See also ==
- Banca Agricola Popolare di Ragusa, other Sicilian bank
- Banca Nuova, a defunct subsidiary of Intesa Sanpaolo
- Banco Popolare Siciliano, a brand of Banco Popolare
- Credito Siciliano, a subsidiary of Credito Valtellinese
