= Banca del Mezzogiorno – MedioCredito Centrale =

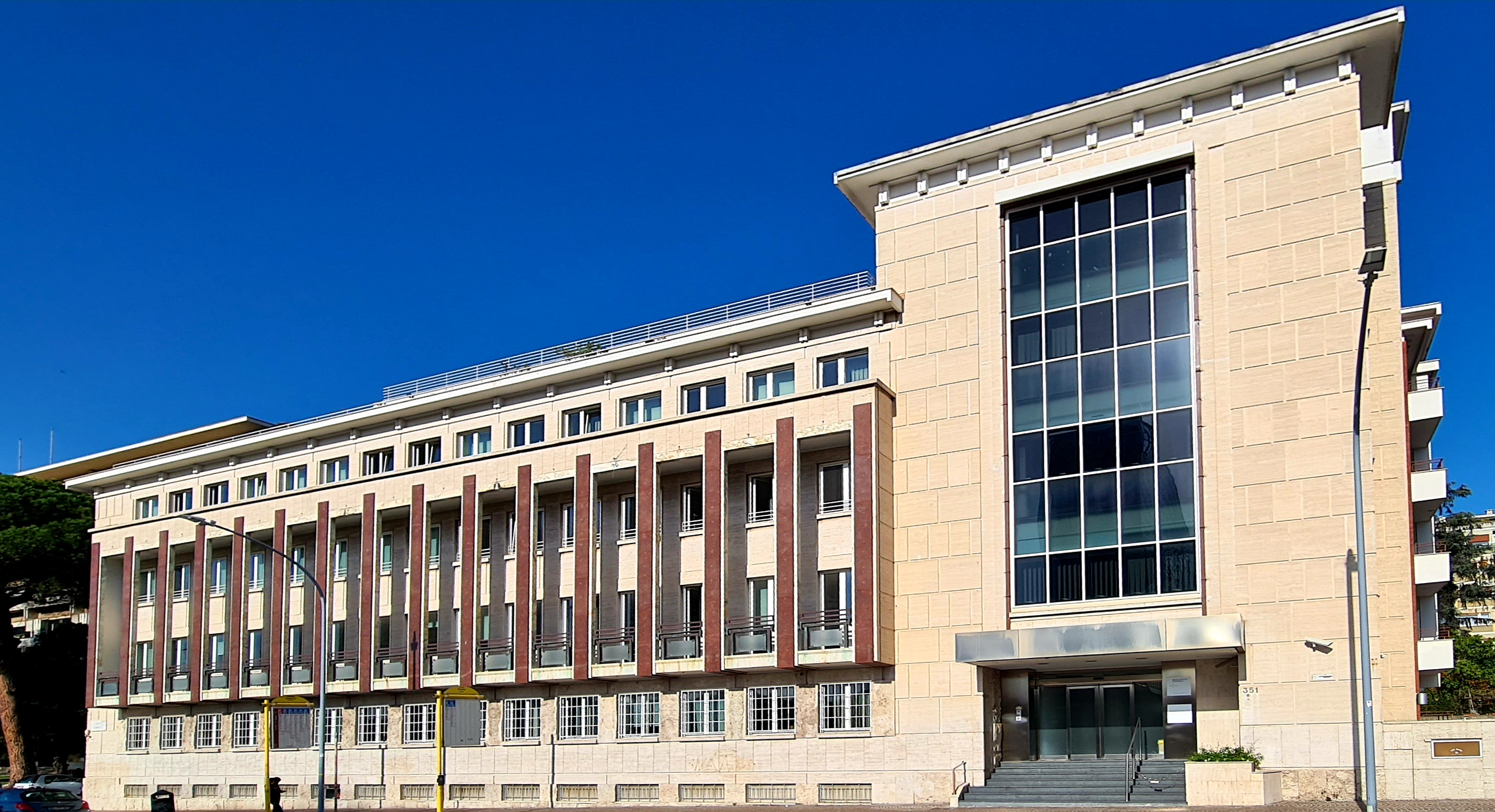
- Head office in EUR, Rome
- Native name: Banca del Mezzogiorno – MedioCredito Centrale S.p.A.
- Formerly: UniCredit MedioCredito Centrale S.p.A. (2008-2011)
- Company type: Private
- Industry: Financial services
- Founded: 1952; 74 years ago
- Headquarters: Viale America, 351, Rome, Italy
- Area served: Italy
- Key people: Massimiliano Cesare (president); Luigi Calabria (CEO)
- Net income: ▼€32,426,505 (2015)
- Total assets: ▲€2,554,438,047 (2015)
- Total equity: ▲€425,511,254 (2015)
- Parent: Invitalia
- Capital ratio: 28.38% (CET1)
- Website: www.mcc.it
- Footnotes / references source

Banca del Mezzogiorno – MedioCredito Centrale (BdM-MCC) is an Italian bank based in Rome, Lazio region. The bank is entirely controlled by Invitalia S.p.A., which in turn is owned by the Ministry of Economy. The bank was specialized in medium-term loan to companies, which developed into corporate and investment banking, and currently specialized in public sector, such as one of the manager of Fondo di Garanzia per le Piccole e Medie Imprese (a guarantee fund for SMEs) of the Ministry of Economic Development, and European Union's Joint European Resources for Micro to Medium Enterprises Calabria Fund. The bank lend medium-term loan from the fund to SMEs for Italian government and the European Union.

== History ==
Istituto Centrale per il Credito a Medio Termine a Favore delle Medie e Piccole Industrie was found in 1952 as a statutory corporation (Italian: ente di diritto pubblico) and part of the Mediocredito initiative. Due to Legge Amato, On 11 March 1994 the bank became MedioCredito Centrale - Istituto Centrale per il Credito a Medio Termine S.p.A. (a limited company, società per azioni).

The bank subscribed the capital increase of Banco di Sicilia in 1997.

=== Capitalia era ===
In 1999 Banca di Roma, via subsidiary MedioCredito di Roma, acquired MedioCredito Centrale.

As part of a reversed merger, Banca Intesa (undisclosed) and UniCredit (0.06%) sold the minority interests in MedioCredito di Roma, for the shares of Mediocredito Centrale (0.7% and 0.03% respectively) in 2000. Banca di Roma owned 97.99% shares of Mediocredito Centrale as at 31 December 2000.

In December 2001 MedioCredito Centrale absorbed its subsidiary Sofipa, despite Sofipa SGR was retained. During the year 2001 minority interests of 2.11% in the bank was acquired from Banca Intesa, UniCredit and other companies. At the same time MCC had a put option to sell the minority interests in Unieuro and Euroclass Multimedia Holding as part of the deal.

On 24 May 2002 MedioCredito Centrale was renamed to MCC S.p.A.. During 2002 MCC acquired 5.569% shares of sports club S.S. Lazio. (whole Capitala Group owned 5.702% shares of S.S. Lazio) Banca di Roma Group became Capitalia Group on 1 July 2002. In December 2002, Capitalia sold 20.1% shares of MCC to other companies, for €241.2 million.

MCC only hold 0.37% shares of S.S. Lazio at the end of 2003, which was sold to parent company Capitalia in June. (whole Capitalia Group owned 5.760%) At the end of year 2003 Capitalia just hold 73.90% shares of MCC, (by selling 3% shares each to Gianpaolo Angelucci and Vittorio Merloni family (Fineldo) and acquiring 100% shares of Cofiri from the families) but increased to 75.4% in January 2004 by acquiring 1.5% shares from Parmalat for €22 million. In 2004 MCC also participated in the capital increase of sports club S.S. Lazio, which MCC owned 1.167% shares at the end of year 2004 (Capitalia Group owned 17.717%).

In 2005 MCC absorbed Capitalia Leasing & Factoring, a sister company. At the same time some business was sold by MCC to Capitalia . Capitalia also re-acquired 3% shares of MCC from other parties during year 2005. However, Finanziaria Tosinvest (3%), Fininvest (3%), Toro Assicurazioni (3%), Telecom Italia (3%), Fineldo (2.25%), Keryx (1%), Cinecittà Centro Commerciale (1%), Colacem (1%), Angelini Partecipazioni Finanziarie (1%), Italmobiliare (1%), M and M Holding (1%), Faber Factor International (0.75%), Finwellness (0.5%) and Matteo Arpe (0.1%, CEO of Capitalia and MCC itself) remained as the minority shareholders of MCC, as at 31 December 2005. In 2006 Capitalia re-acquired the all remaining minority interests from aforementioned companies and person.

The last annual report of MCC before the group was acquired by UniCredit, shown MCC had a shareholders' equity of €954,387,564, a total assets of €12,759,436.124 and a Tier 1 capital ratio of 7.50% as at 31 December 2006.

=== UniCredit era ===
In 2008 the bank was renamed to UniCredit MedioCredito Centrale S.p.A. The real estate business of MCC was transferred to sister companies UniCredit Real Estate. At the same time UniCredit Infrastrutture S.p.A. (project finance, which received the business from UniCredit Banca MedioCredito on 31 December 2005) was absorbed by MCC, but at the same time some MCC business was moved to UniCredit Corporate Banking. After the reorganization MCC was specialized in public sector only.

After the deals, total assets of MCC were reduced to €7,224,544,134, shareholders equity was reduced to €731,332,532 and Tier 1 capital ratio was increased to 16.59% as at 31 December 2008.

Another restructure of MCC was made during 2010, which the total assets of the bank was reduced to €1,160,941,655, shareholders equity was reduced to €174,023,376 and Tier 1 capital ratio was increased to 42.06% as at 31 December 2010.

On 1 August 2011 the bank was sold to Poste Italiane for €136 million, a price almost equal to share capital and share premium reserve of MCC as at 30 June 2011 (€138,062,413).

=== Poste italiane era ===
The bank was renamed to Banca del Mezzogiorno – MedioCredito Centrale S.p.A. circa 2012, which Mezzogiorno was another name for the southern Italy. The original Mediocredito del Sud was absorbed by MedioCredito Lombardo in 1999. Banca del Mezzogiorno became the only government owned bank in the sector of financing small and medium-sized firms in Italy, with the rest were privatized. The Tier 1 capital of the bank had almost no change in the first 1½ years. (€138.418 million mid-2011, €135.840 million in end 2011, €137.095 million in mid-2012 and €141.952 million in end 2012). on 28 March 2012 the bank was one of the banks that were selected to manage Fondo di Garanzia per le Piccole e Medie Imprese (a guarantee fund for SMEs) of the Ministry of Economic Development in a 9-year contract. (other banks were Mediocredito Italiano, Artigiancassa, Istituto Centrale delle Banche Popolari Italiane and MPS Capital Services) On 30 March, Banca del Mezzogiorno, along with Artigiancassa, signed contracts with Cassa Depositi e Prestiti, to provide back office for Kyoto Fund of the Ministry of the Environment.

In December 2012 the bank became one of the fund manager for the European Union's Joint European Resources for Micro to Medium Enterprises (JEREMIE) in Calabria, for €42 million. In 2014 Poste italiane recapitalized Banca del Mezzogiorno for €232 million. In 2015 the bank was re-privatized partially, as the Ministry of Economy and Finance had sold 35% shares of Poste Italiane to the public.

=== Invitalia era ===
In August 2017 the ownership of the bank was entirely transferred to Invitalia S.p.A., a development agency owned by the Ministry of Economy and Finance.

In 2020, following the bailout of Banca Popolare di Bari, Mediocredito Centrale took the control of Popolare di bari, which led in 2021 to a downgrade of MCC's rating by Moody's.

== See also ==
- List of banks in the euro area
- List of banks in Italy
