= Sicilcassa =

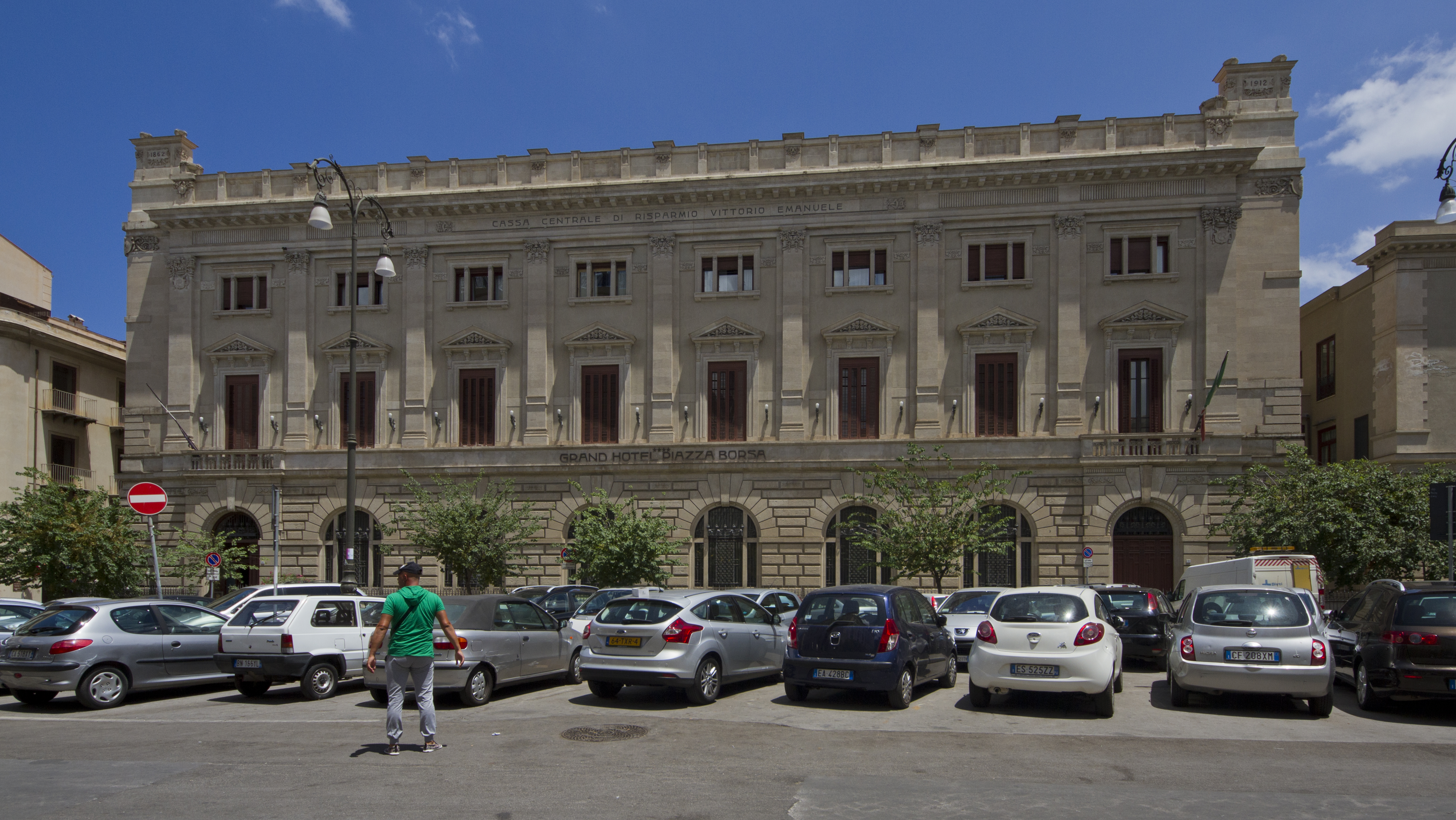
- Former head office on Piazza Borsa, Palermo
- Native name: Sicilcassa
- Formerly: Cassa Centrale di Risparmio Vittorio Emanuele per le Province Siciliane
- Founded: 1861
- Defunct: 1997
- Headquarters: Palermo, Italy

Sicilcassa S.p.A. also known as Cassa Centrale di Risparmio Vittorio Emanuele per le Province Siciliane, was an Italian bank based in Palermo, Sicily.

== History ==
Cassa Centrale di Risparmio Vittorio Emanuele per le Province Siciliane was split into Sicilcassa S.p.A. and Fondazione Cassa Centrale di Risparmio Vittorio Emanuele per le Province Siciliane on 24 January 1992. In 1996 it faced insolvency.

In 1997 it was acquired by Banco di Sicilia.

== See also ==
- Banco Popolare Siciliano
- Credito Siciliano
- List of banks in Italy
