= Nuova Banca =

Nuova Banca means new bank, may refer to the following Italian banks:

- Nuova Banca dell'Etruria e del Lazio, a defunct subsidiary of UBI Banca
- Nuova Banca delle Marche, a defunct subsidiary of UBI Banca
- Nuova Banca Mediterranea, a defunct subsidiary of Banca Popolare di Bari
- Nuova Banca del Monte Sant'Agata, former name of Credito Siciliano

== See also ==
- Nuovo Banco Ambrosiano, predecessor of Intesa Sanpaolo
- Banca Nuova, an Italian bank
- Banca della Nuova Terra, an Italian bank, a wholly owned subsidiary of Banca Popolare di Sondrio

.
