= Chiara Mio =

Italian business executive and economist

Chiara Mio (born 1964) is an Italian business executive, accounting and sustainability researcher. She is a full professor at the Department of Management at Ca’ Foscari University of Venice, Italy. As a chairwoman of Crédit Agricole FriulAdria (Crédit Agricole Italia Bank Group), Mio became the first woman in Italy to lead a commercial bank.

== Early life ==
Mio was born in Pordenone, Italy. In 1983, a young high-school graduate, Mio became one of the 25 best graduates of Italy in terms of academic merit and was awarded the certificate and the medal of honor Alfiere del Lavoro by the President of the Italian Republic at that time, Sandro Pertini.

Mio holds a degree in Business Administration from Ca’ Foscari University of Venice, Italy.

== Career ==
Mio combines academic research with corporate practice.

=== Professional career ===
Mio is currently a board member of a number of companies listed on Italian Stock Exchange ( Aquafil SpA, O.V.S. SpA, ANIMA Holding, ANIMA SGR, Castello SGR) as well as several non-listed companies. Since November 2026, she has been President of FFI (Future Farming Initiative). Mio was included by StartupItalia in the Unstoppable Women list of the most influential and innovative women in Italy for two consecutive years, in 2024 and 2025.

From 2014 to 2022, Mio has been a chairwoman of Crédit Agricole FriulAdria SpA (Gruppo Bancario Crédit Agricole Italia). She has also been a board member of Danieli e C. Officine Meccaniche SpA, Banco BPM SpA and Eurotech SpA, and non-profit organisations such as Pordenonelegge Foundation and Burlo Garofolo Foundation.

Between 2006 and 2012, Mio has been a member of City Council of Pordenone and a delegate for Budget, Programming, Innovation and Development and, successively, for Education, Training and Knowledge for Innovation.

=== Academic career ===
After graduating from Ca’ Foscari University of Venice in 1987, Mio began her academic career at the same university first as a researcher (1991-2000), then as an associate professor (2000-2011). Since 2011, she holds a position of full professor at the Department of Management where she teaches courses on corporate reporting, management control, strategic planning and sustainability management.

Mio is a director of Master program in Sustainability Management and a member of the teaching committee for the PhD program in Science and Management of Climate Change at Ca’ Foscari University of Venice.

From 2009 to 2014, she acted as Dean's Delegate for Environmental Sustainability and Social Responsibility.

Mio is a founder and director of Sustainability Lab of Department of Management, Ca’ Foscari University.

Mio is a member of the editorial board and a reviewer of Corporate Social Responsibility and Environmental Management journal since 2010. She is a member of the scientific committee of several editorial series and EticaNews.

== Publications ==
Mio is an author of several books and articles on corporate and integrating reporting, sustainability, value creation and performance management. Her work has been published in Accounting, Auditing and Accountability Journal; Business Strategy and the Environment; Corporate Social Responsibility and Environmental Management; Journal of Cleaner Production; Corporate reputation review; Accounting, Business and Financial History; Journal of Environmental Accounting and Management; Rivista Italiana di Ragioneria e di Economia aziendale (RIREA). In 2025, Mio has been included in the Stanford-Elsevier World’s Top 2% Scientists List.

== Scientific contribution ==
Mio sustains the idea that companies in pursuit of sustainability need to go beyond charity initiatives and corporate welfare practices. According to Mio, managing a sustainable company implies:

- developing a new concept of product or service underpinned by technology innovation, economic accessibility and close cooperation with the public
- building a new business model that is oriented towards the future long-term value creation
- reorganizing the production process to reduce consumption of natural resources
- focus on circular economy
- emphasis on the respect toward each individual, human rights protection and equitable and fair wealth distribution
- changing the short-term profit-seeking mindset of a “hunter” to the one of a “farmer” whose values are geared towards cultivating the land responsibly to ensure its long-term use for the future generations and overall prosperity of the community
- taking responsibility for increasing consumer understanding, appreciation and use of the new sustainable consumption models and educating them on the path of becoming “better citizens”.

== Professional associations ==
In April 2022, Mio was appointed a member of Sustainability Reporting Technical Expert Group of the European Financial Reporting Advisory Group (EFRAG). Since 2026, Mio has been a member of the Working Group on Sustainability Reporting of the Italian Accounting Standard Setter (OIC). Since 2021, she is a vice-chair of SME and Sustainability policy group at Accountancy Europe in Brussels, Belgium.

From 2020 to 2026, she served on the Board of the International Federation of Accountants (IFAC), where she chaired the Public Policy and Regulatory Advisory Group (PPRAG) in 2025 and 2026.

Mio is a member of the Scientific Committee of CSR Manager Network, CSR and Social Innovation Forum (Salone della CSR e dell'innovazione sociale). She is Chairwoman of the “Sustainability and Corporate Reporting” Commission and a designated expert on the “Integrated reporting” topic of the National Council of Chartered Accountants and Accounting Experts (Consiglio Nazionale Dottori Commercialisti ed Esperti Contabili, CNDCEC) and a member of the Steering Committee Global Compact Italy.
