= Banca Popolare di Cividale =

- Native name: Banca Popolare di Cividale S.C.p.A.
- Company type: Società Cooperativa per Azioni
- ISIN: IT0001014783
- Industry: Financial services
- Founded: 1886
- Headquarters: 8/1 via Sen. Guglielmo Pelizzo, Cividale del Friuli, Italy
- Number of locations: 75 branches (2014)
- Area served: Friuli – Venezia Giulia; Veneto (province of Treviso, Belluno and Venice only)
- Services: Retail and corporate banking
- Net income: ▲€10.065 million (2014)
- Total assets: ▼€4.229 billion (2014)
- Total equity: ▲€276.177 million (2014)
- Owner: Cassa di Risparmio di Bolzano (74%)
- Subsidiaries: Civileasing (100%)
- Capital ratio: 10.04% (CET1)
- Website: Official website

Banca Popolare di Cividale is an Italian cooperative bank based in Cividale del Friuli, Friuli - Venezia Giulia.

== History ==
Banca Popolare di Cividale società cooperativa a responsabilità limitata was found in 1886. In 2000 the bank acquired the controlling interests of Banca Agricola di Gorizia from Cardine Banca and minority shareholders (80%).

=== Banca di Cividale ===
In 2000 a joint venture Banca di Cividale S.p.A., was formed by BP Cividale and Deutsche Bank S.p.A., the Italian subsidiary of Deutsche Bank A.G., in a 70-30 ratio. BP Cividale became a holding company instead. However, Deutsche Bank sold 20% shares back to BP Cividale in 2002.

In 2002 BP Cividale sold 10% shares of Banca di Cividale to Cattolica Assicurazioni for €19.625 million, which the insurance company sold products in the network of Banca di Cividale. In 2003 Deutsche Bank, sold the remaining 10% shares back to BP Cividale for €16,093,728. In 2004, Banca di Cividale issued 2.4 million new shares to Credito Valtellinese, which equivalent to 22.22% shares capital of the bank (increased to 25% in 2005); BP Cividale acquired a minority interests in Banca dell'Artigianato e dell'Industria for 4.58% (increased to 9.864% in 2005); While Cattolica Assicurazioni's ownership on the bank was diluted to 7.78%. In the same year Banca di Cividale acquired a minority interests (4.3%) in Banka për Biznes, a Kosovar bank.

In 2005 BP Cividale was changed from S.c.a r.l. to Società Cooperativa per Azioni. In the same year Banca di Cividale acquired 5.5% shares of Deželna Banka Slovenije. BP Cividale also bought back 7.78% shares of Banca di Cividale from Cattolica Assicurazioni for €20.7 million in 2006, which the partnership would also ended on 31 December 2007.

In 2011 BP Cividale sold the shares of Banca dell'Artigianato e dell'Industria to Credito Valtellinese, at the same time the holding acquired 5% shares of Banca di Cividale from Credito Valtellinese. In 2013 Banca di Cividale was merged back to BP Cividale (along with NordEst Banca). The 20% shares of Banca di Cividale was bought for €69,574,863.5 cash and 169,277 number of shares of BP Cividale (for €4,147,286.50), equivalent to 1% share capital of BP Cividale. Credito Valtellinese also lent €15 million (as subordinated loan) to BP Cividale as part of agreement.

The last annual report of Banca di Cividale shown the company had a shareholders' equity of €229 million, as well as Tier 1 capital ratio of 13.15%.

=== Other subsidiaries ===
In 2007, Civileasing, a jointly controlled subsidiary of BP Cividale and Banca di Cividale, became a wholly owned subsidiary of BP Cividale instead.

In 2009 BP Cividale acquired a controlling interests (51%) in NordEst Banca. The bank was absorbed into parent company in 2013.

== See also ==
- Banca Popolare FriulAdria, a subsidiary of Crédit Agricole which based in Friuli – Venezia Giulia
- Cassa di Risparmio del Friuli Venezia Giulia, a subsidiary of Intesa Sanpaolo which based in Friuli – Venezia Giulia
- Banca Popolare Udinese, a defunct subsidiary of Banca Popolare di Vicenza which based in Friuli – Venezia Giulia
- Cassa di Risparmio di Trieste, a defunct subsidiary of UniCredit which based in Friuli – Venezia Giulia
- Banca Mediocredito del Friuli Venezia Giulia a commercial bank based in Friuli – Venezia Giulia
