= ARCA Fondi SGR =

Italian fund management company

Arca Fondi SGR
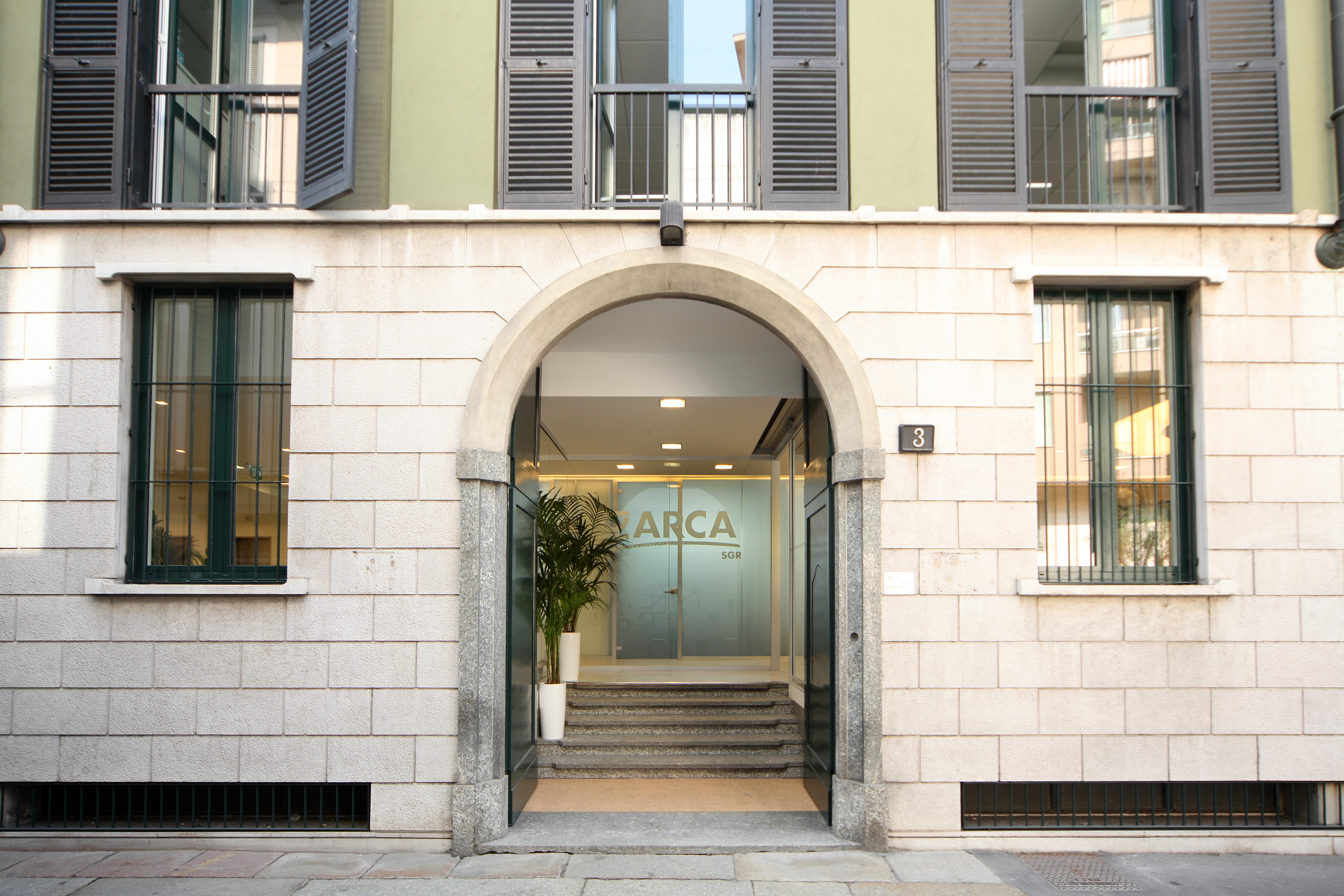
- Arca Fondi SGR HQ, Milan
- Native name: Arca Fondi SGR
- Type: S.p.A
- Industry: Financial services
- Founded: 1983; 43 years ago
- Founder: ARCA
- Headquarters: 3 via Disciplini, Milan, Italy
- Key people: Giuseppe Lusignani (Chairman); Ugo Loeser (CEO)
- Services: Asset management
- AUM: €50,6 billion (2025)
- Owner: BPER Banca (91,776%)
- Website: www.arcafondi.it/s/

Arca Fondi SGR (Italian: Società di Gestione del Risparmio) is an Italian fund management company based in Milan.

The company was born from the experience of Arca SGR SpA, founded in October 1983, thanks to the effort of 12 Italian Cooperative Banks and over the years has added other credit institutions and financial companies as distributors. Arca Fondi SGR became one of the leading companies in asset management in Italy thanks to its widespread presence: over 100 distributors, 8,000 bank branches, as well as a network of financial advisors and online channels.

== History ==
In September 1984 the first two Arca mutual funds, Arca BB and Arca RR Diversified Bond, were launched on the market. In 1987, the company reached a historic milestone of reaching 100,000 customers. Arca Fondi was one of the first companies to offer open pension funds in Italy, thanks to the opening in 1998 of Arca Previdenza. In 2009, with Arca Cedola Funds, it is among the first companies on the market to launch income distribution products, with a target maturity.

Since 2015, the company paid particular attention to the Italian mid and small cap equity market with the launch of the Arca Economia Reale Equity Italia Fund, which takes advantage of the growth opportunities of Small Medium Enterprises. In 2017 Arca Fondi has been one of the first asset management companies to open a PIR Fund (Individual Savings Plans) with Arca Economia Reale Bilanciato Italia. In 2019, the company became a signatory of the Principles for Responsible Investment of the United Nations. Following the acquisition and subsequent incorporation of Banca Popolare di Sondrio in 2025, BPER Banca holds a commanding stake in ARCA Fondi SGR.

== Shareholders ==
Arca Fondi SGR S.p.A. is 100% owned by Arca Holding, whose share capital is divided as follows:

- BPER Banca (91,776%)
- Banca Popolare del Lazio (1.804%)
- Sanfelice 1893 Banca Popolare (1.536%)
- Banca Valsabbina (1.511%)
- Banca Popolare Valconca (0.620%)
- Banca Agricola Popolare di Ragusa (0.320%)
- Banca di Piacenza (0.256%)
- Banca Popolare di Fondi (0.066%).
