= Banca di Credito Popolare di Torre del Greco =

People's bank in Torre del Greco

Banca di Credito Popolare
- Native name: Banca di Credito Popolare S.C.p.A.
- Company type: Società Cooperativa per Azioni
- Industry: Financial services
- Founded: 19 April 1888
- Headquarters: Palazzo Vallelonga, 92/100 C.so Vittorio Emanuele, Torre del Greco, Italy
- Number of locations: 67 branches (2014)
- Area served: Campania; Cassino & Formia, Lazio
- Net income: ▲€7,833,940 (2014)
- Total assets: ▼€2,366,331,090 (2014)
- Total equity: ▲€231,836,244 (2014)
- Owner: 5355 individuals and 388 companies
- Capital ratio: 12.90% (CET1)
- Website: Official website (in Italian)
- Footnotes / references source

Banca di Credito Popolare S.C.p.A. (BCP) is an Italian cooperative bank based in Torre del Greco, in the Metropolitan City of Naples. Most of the clients of the bank are from the same area, in which the bank has 44 branches.

== History ==
Società Anonima Cooperativa di Credito Popolare was found on 19 April 1888. The bank absorbed Banca Popolare Cooperativa del Matese in 1968. In 1971 the bank acquired the residual assets of Banca Popolare di Secondigliano. From 1999 to 2003 the bank absorbed Banca di Credito Cooperativo di Nusco, Partenio and Cervino e Durazzano.

The bank owned a minority interest in ISVEIMER, which was sold to Banco di Napoli in 1993. The bank also sold its 0.116% stake in Istituto Centrale delle Banche Popolari Italiane in 2015.

== See also ==
- Banco di Napoli
- Banca della Campania
