= Cassa per il Mezzogiorno =

Italian government economic project

The Cassa del Mezzogiorno (English: "Fund for the South") was a public effort by the government of Italy to stimulate economic growth and development in Southern Italy (also known as the Mezzogiorno). It was established in 1950 primarily to encourage the development of public works and infrastructure (roads, bridges, hydroelectric and irrigation) projects, and to provide credit subsidies and tax advantages to promote investments. It was dissolved in 1984, although its mandate was maintained by successive, less centralized institutions.

It focused mostly on rural areas and many say that it assisted Southern Italy to enter the modern world, although there is evidence that some of the funds were squandered due to poor financial management by the local southern governments. Historian Denis Mack Smith noted, in the 1960s, that about a third of the money was squandered. Steel mills and other projects were promised but never built, and many irrigation projects and dams were never completed as intended. Another reason the project was less successful than hoped is because the various organized criminal syndicates used the funds for other purposes.

The government-led industry that was created was marginal, but the need for skilled labour led to a drop in southern unemployment. Italian journalist Luigi Barzini also noted that funds were usually given to major Italian companies to build large scale, highly automated manufacturing plants, requiring huge amounts of money to build and needing minimal staffing due to the automated nature of the plants.

Projects in the South that failed are sometimes called "cathedrals in the desert", as they were projects built in the middle of nowhere that hardly anybody would use or find. However, the effectiveness of such projects is still debated and recently reevaluated.

== See also ==
- IRFIS – FinSicilia
- Banca di Credito Sardo
- ISVEIMER
- List of banks in Italy
