= FriulAdria =

Italian Bank

Crédit Agricole FriulAdria
- Formerly: Banca Cooperativa Popolare di Pordenone; Banca Popolare di Pordenone; Banca Popolare FriulAdria
- Type: Subsidiary; società per azioni (legal form); cooperative (former legal form)
- Industry: Financial services
- Founded: 1911
- Defunct: 2022
- Fate: Incorporated in Crédit Agricole Italia
- Headquarters: Pordenone, Friuli – Venezia Giulia
- Area served: Friuli Venezia Giulia; Veneto
- Key people: Chiara Mio (chairperson)
- Products: Retail banking
- Revenue: ▲€308 million (2013)
- Operating income: ▲€120 million (2013)
- Net income: ▲€28.5 million (2013)
- Total assets: ▼€7.75 billion (2013)
- Total equity: ▲€694 million (2013)
- Owner: Crédit Agricole S.A. (via Crédit Agricole Italia (100%))
- Number of employees: ▼1672 (2013)
- Parent: Crédit Agricole Italia
- Website: http://www.credit-agricole.it/

Crédit Agricole FriulAdria S.p.A. formerly known as Banca Popolare FriulAdria S.p.A., or known as FriulAdria in short (abb. of Friuli and Adriatic Sea), is an Italian bank, which is part of Crédit Agricole Italia, the Italian arm of French banking group Crédit Agricole.

Since 2016, one website was used for the whole Italian banking group.

== History ==
FriulAdria was found as Banca Cooperativa Popolare di Pordenone in 1911, as an urban co-operative bank. In the 1990s, the bank merged with Banca Cooperativa Operaia di Pordenone, Banca Popolare di Tarcento and Banca Popolare di Latisana, the latter were located in the nearby Province of Udine.

A report by Mediobanca, shown BP Pordenone was ranked 134th by total deposits (excluding inter-bank deposits) in 1988, among all type of commercial banks, while BP Latisana was ranked 313th and BP Tarcento, 374th. Their counterpart in Udine, Banca Popolare Udinese, was ranked 171st, which was acquired by Banca Popolare di Vicenza in 1998.

Also by the data of Mediobanca, FriulAdria was ranked 98th, its rival Cassa di Risparmio di Udine e Pordenone 95th, and BP Udinese 141st in 1994. That year also saw C.R. Udine e Pordenone formed a new banking group Casse Venete Banca, as well as the formation of Unicredito by other savings banks in nearby Veneto region.

According to the Bank of Italy, in the eve of the acquisition on 31 March 1998, FriulAdria had 54 branches in Friuli Venezia Giulia and 33 branches in Veneto, with a market share of 29.4% in the Province of Pordenone before the merger, or pro-forma 35.3% after the merger (adding the market share of Intesa), which was ahead Credito Italiano (21%) and aforementioned C.R. Udine e Pordenone (12%).

=== Banca Intesa era ===
The bank was part of Banca Intesa Group, which held 100% share capital in 1998. Banca Intesa issued new shares of Banca Intesa to the owners of FriulAdria, and purchased the shares of FriulAdria from them. In 1999, the former shareholder fully subscribed the warrants of FriulAdria's shares, made Banca Intesa's ownership ratio reduced to 66.47%. In the next year Banca Intesa increased the ownership ratio to 76.05%, by transferring 60 branches of Banco Ambrosiano Veneto located in Friuli-Venezia Giulia, to FriulAdria, thus the bank became one of the most important bank in Friuli-Venezia Giulia, according to the bank itself.

=== Crédit Agricole era ===
FriulAdria old logo

However, after the merger of Intesa with Sanpaolo IMI in 2007, one the major shareholder of the new entity, Crédit Agricole, parted away from Intesa Sanpaolo by decreasing its share holding, as well as increased the participation in Italy directly by acquiring Cariparma and FriulAdria from Intesa Sanpaolo, as well as an additional 202 former Banca Intesa branches. After a complex transaction, FriulAdria major shareholder was Cariparma, for 78.68% shares, which in turn Crédit Agricole S.A. indirectly controlling 59.01% interests on FriulAdria. FriulAdria received 29 branches out of aforementioned 202. The disinvestment was also a prevention of a monopoly market share, as stated by the Italian Competition Authority (AGCM), due to the extensive network of Cassa di Risparmio del Friuli Venezia Giulia (ex-C.R. Udine and C.R. Gorizia), a former Sanpaolo IMI subsidiary and now Intesa Sanpaolo.

In 2011, Crédit Agricole further withdrew from Intesa Sanpaolo Group, as well as acquiring 96 branches from it. FriulAdria received 15 out of 96.

As of 2013, FriulAdria had 199 branches. In April 2015, the General Management was hired by Dr. Roberto Ghisellini from Carispezia. Since 2018, the new general manager is Carlo Piana.

== See also ==
- Cassa di Risparmio del Friuli Venezia Giulia, a Friuli Venezia Giulia based subsidiary of Intesa Sanpaolo
- Banca Popolare di Cividale, a Friuli Venezia Giulia based cooperative bank
- Banca Mediocredito del Friuli Venezia Giulia, a Friuli Venezia Giulia based commercial bank

- Cassa di Risparmio di Trieste, a defunct subsidiary of UniCredit which based in Friuli – Venezia Giulia
- Banca Popolare Udinese, a defunct subsidiary of Banca Popolare di Vicenza which based in Friuli – Venezia Giulia
- Banca dell'Adriatico, a defunct subsidiary of Intesa Sanpaolo, based in Marche region
- Banca Adriatica, a defunct subsidiary of UBI Banca, based in Marche region
