= Banca Generali =

Italian bank

- Native name: Banca Generali S.p.A.
- Company type: Private banking
- Traded as: BIT: BGN; FTSE MIB Component
- Industry: Financial services
- Predecessor: Cassa di Risparmio di Trieste Specialcredito (bank license and legal person)
- Founded: 1998; 28 years ago
- Founder: Assicurazioni Generali
- Headquarters: Trieste, Italy
- Area served: Private banking; wealth Management; personal Financial Services.
- Key people: Gian Maria Mossa, CEO
- Services: private banking; asset management; fiduciary
- Operating income: ▲€837 m (2024)
- Net income: ▲€431m (2024)
- Total assets: ▲€103.8 billion (2024)
- Total equity: ▲€1,153 million (2024)
- Owner: Generali Group (50,17%); Silchester International Investors (6,35%)
- Number of employees: 838 (1Q 2020)
- Parent: Generali
- Capital ratio: 14.1% (CET1)
- Website: bancagenerali.com
- Footnotes / references in consolidated basis

Banca Generali S.p.A. is an Italian bank focused on private banking and wealth management for high-net-worth individuals. The bank is a component of FTSE MIB index, representing the blue-chip of Borsa Italiana. The majority of its shares are owned by the Italian Insurance Group, Assicurazioni Generali.

Banca Generali has been awarded the "Best Private Bank in Italy Award" from the FT's Group magazines for the years 2012, 2015, 2017, 2018 and 2019.

In September 2018, Banca Generali inaugurated new operating offices in Citylife.

In April 2025, Mediobanca bid 6.3 billion euro ($7.17 billion) to buy Banca Generali.

== Financial Performance ==
Year	Net Profit	Operating Result	Total Assets	Total Equity
2024	€431 m	€837 m	€103.8 b	€1,153 m

== See also ==
- List of banks in the euro area
- List of banks in Italy
