= Banca Agricola Popolare di Sicilia =

Italian cooperative bank

Banca Agricola Popolare di Ragusa
- Native name: Banca Agricola Popolare di Ragusa Società Cooperativa per Azioni
- Company type: Co-operative
- Industry: Financial services
- Founded: 1889
- Headquarters: 65 Viale Europa, Ragusa, Sicily, Italy
- Number of locations: 85 branches (2019)
- Area served: - 6 out of 9 provinces of Sicily; - Milan, Lombardy
- Key people: Giovanni Cartia (chairman); Saverio Continella (general manager)
- Services: Retail banking
- Net income: ▲€ 9.439.220 million (2019)
- Total assets: ▲€ 4.287.865 billion (2019)
- Total equity: ▼€ 562.531 million (2019)
- Number of employees: 836 (2019)
- Subsidiaries: Finsud SIM Spa, IAPR Srl
- Capital ratio: 26.24% (CET1)
- Website: www.bapr.it
- Footnotes / references In consolidated financial statements

Banca Agricola Popolare di Sicilia, known until 2024 as Banca Agricola Popolare di Ragusa S.C.p.A., is an Italian cooperative bank based in Ragusa, Sicily.

The bank had 84 branches inside the island (in the areas of Ragusa, Catania, Siracusa, Messina, Palermo, Enna), plus one branch in mainland Italy, in Milan.

== History ==
The foundation of the bank dates back to 10 March 1889, the date on which the Banca Popolare Cooperativa di Ragusa was born (later incorporated into the institution in question, founded in 1902). In 1999 the bank was ranked 9th in terms of branches on the island with 56 branches, behind Banco di Sicilia, Banca Popolare di Lodi, Banca Antonveneta, Banca Commerciale Italiana, Banca Monte dei Paschi di Siena, Banca Popolare Sant'Angelo, Credito Valtellinese and Credito Emiliano. The bank was only ahead Sanpaolo IMI which had 50 branches. After several merger and acquisitions, the aforementioned banks became part of the UniCredit, Banco BPM (as Banco Popolare Siciliano), Banca Monte dei Paschi di Siena, Intesa Sanpaolo (4 of out 5 largest banks of Italy), as well as Banca Carige (acquired 20 branches from Banco di Sicilia) Credito Valtellinese (as Credito Siciliano) and Credito Emiliano which also from the north. Banca Agricola Popolare di Ragusa and Banca Popolare Sant'Angelo were one of the few surviving independent banks on the island.

In 2019 the shareholders of the bank had a disagreement with the managers of the bank. The dispute was settled by the intervention of the Ministry of Economy and Finance. The bank also bought back the shares from the market in the same year.

The Banca Agricola Popolare di Ragusa group also controls a real estate company based in Ragusa (IAPR Srl), and a stock brokerage company based in Milan (Finsud SIM Spa).

== Equity interests ==
- ARCA SGR (0.320%)

== Awards ==
- "Creators of Value" (Milano Finanza Global Awards 2018)
- Best bank for capital requirements (Milano Finanza Global Awards 2019)
- Best bank in the Sicily Region (Milano Finanza Global Awards 2019)

== See also ==
- Banca Popolare Sant'Angelo (other Sicilian bank)

== Bibliography ==
- Di Stefano Miriam, Granozzi Luciano, Miccichè Giuseppe, Vittorio Agatino, La Banca agricola popolare di Ragusa. Frammenti di un secolo di storia 1889-1989, Sellerio Editore, Palermo, 1989.
