= ISVEIMER =

Istituto per lo Sviluppo Economico dell'Italia Meridionale S.p.A., known as ISVEIMER, is a former Italian bank based in Naples, Campania. The bank was in liquidation since 1996, which the headquarter of the company was relocated to Rome. However, due to the subsidized loan, the company was still in wind-down phase as in 2015.

== History ==
The bank was established in 1938 and since 1953 as one of the 19 Mediocredito of Italy and one of the three Istituti per il Finanziamento a Medio Terminealle Medie e Piccole Industrie nell'Italia Meridionale e Insulare (Istituti Meridionale) which was funded by Cassa per il Mezzogiorno. The bank provided medium term loan to small and medium industries from Southern Italy, except in the two islands (covered by Credito Industriale Sardo and IRFIS respectively). Due to Legge Amato, the bank became a limited company (Italian: Società per Azioni) in 1993. At the time Banco di Napoli owned 44.859% stake, plus an additional 6.16% stake were purchased from Cassa di Risparmio di Calabria e Lucania, Banca Popolare di Novara, Banca Sannitica, Banca di Roma, Banca della Provincia di Napoli, Cassa di Risparmio della Provincia dell'Aquila, Cassa di Risparmio Salemitana, Banca Popolare di Taranto, Banca di Credito Popolare di Torre del Greco and Banca Popolare di Crotone.

However, in 1996, the bank entered a voluntary liquidation. After the start of liquidation, Banco di Napoli owned a controlling stake in ISVEIMER (65.22% in 2001), as well as an additional 0.17% stake owned by Banca dell'Adriatico, a bank joined Sanpaolo IMI Group in 2002. The stake held by Banco di Napoli and Banca dell'Adriatico soon transferred to parent company Sanpaolo IMI (65.40% stake in 2006), and then Intesa Sanpaolo in 2007 (65.47% stake). An additional 0.04% stake was owned by Cassa di Risparmio di Ascoli Piceno, a Banca Intesa subsidiary.

== See also ==
- List of banks in Italy
