= Banca Nuova =

- Native name: Banca Nuova S.p.A.
- Company type: Subsidiary
- Industry: Financial services
- Predecessor: [old] Banca Nuova (branches and name only); Banca del Popolo – Banca Popolare (the legal person and branches)
Founded
1883 in Trapani	(Banca del Popolo)
2000 in Treviso	(Banca Nuova)
2002 in Palermo	(merger)
2010–11	(re-incorporation)
Founder
Giuseppe D'Alì	(co-founder in 1883)
Banca Popolare di Vicenza	(2002 merger)
- Defunct: April 2018
- Fate: absorbed by Intesa Sanpaolo
- Successor: branches of Intesa Sanpaolo
- Headquarters: Palermo, Italy
Number of locations
▼81 branches	(Dec.2016)
81 branches	(Jun.2017)
- Area served: Sicily region; Calabria region; Rieti, Lazio (former)
- Key people: Gabriele Piccini (CEO)
Net income
▲ negative €47 million	(2016FY)
▲ negative €14 million	(20171H)
Total assets
€4.148 billion	(Dec.2016)
▼€3.943 billion	(Jun.2017)
Total equity
▲€160 million	(Dec.2016)
▲€196 million	(Jun.2017)
- Owner: Banca Popolare di Vicenza (until 26 June 2017); Intesa Sanpaolo (since 26 June 2017)
Number of employees
▼696	(Dec.2016)
▼670	(Jun.2017)
Capital ratio
▲6.97%	(CET1, Dec.2016)
▼5.38%	(CET1, Jun.2017)
- Website: www.bancanuova.it
- Footnotes / references source: 2016 Annual Report and 2017 Half-yearly report

Banca Nuova S.p.A. was an Italian bank headquartered in Palermo, Sicily island. The bank served the island (the region) mostly, with branches in the Calabria region; It was a subsidiary of Banca Popolare di Vicenza (BPVi), in turn owned by Atlante, a banking sector owned bail-out fund from 2016 to mid-2017. In June 2017 the bank was acquired by Intesa Sanpaolo by another government-funded bail-out, and a plan to absorb the bank was announced in October 2017.

== History ==
The predecessors of the bank, [old] Banca Nuova S.p.A. and Banca del Popolo – Banca Popolare (Banca del Popolo S.p.A., located in Trapani), were formed/acquired by Banca Popolare di Vicenza (BPVi) of the northern Italy in 2000. In July 2002 the [old] Banca Nuova was merged into Banca del Popolo, which the legal person of Banca del Popolo was renamed to [newer] Banca Nuova S.p.A., relocating its headquarters from Trapani to Palermo.

[old] Banca Nuova S.p.A. was a new company incorporated on 25 August 2000 in the Province of Treviso, and acquired 20 branches (19 in Calabria region and 1 in Rieti, Lazio region) from Banca Intesa banking group (from its subsidiaries Banca Carime and Cassa di Risparmio di Rieti respectively) on 1 January 2001. In February 2002, it had 30 branches in the aforementioned area, as well as in Sicily Island, where the company was headquartered. The bank started to open branches on its own since 2000.

=== Banca del Popolo – Banca Popolare (1883–2002) ===
Banca del Popolo – Banca Popolare S.c. a r.l. was a cooperative bank founded in 1883 in Trapani. In 1996, it was exposed that one of the shareholders of the bank (8% of the share capital), Vincenzo Piazza, was linked to mafia.

In terms of branches, Banca del Popolo was not part of the top 10 on the island in 1999; However, the bank was a leader (second) inside the Province of Trapani for 12.06% market share in 1997, in terms of deposits (Italian: raccolta).

The majority stake of the bank was acquired by BPVi circa 2000 and a "public offer to acquire" (Italian: offerta pubblica di acquisto, OPA) The remaining shares were started in late 2000. and completed in February 2001. After the acquisition, the bank was demutualized and became a società per azioni circa 2000-01.

The bank was merged with BPVi's Banca Nuova network in July 2002, the legal person of Banca del Popolo was the surviving entity after the merger, but not the name.

=== Banca Nuova (2002–2018) ===
Since the merger of Banca Nuova and Banca del Popolo, the bank has grown its network by acquiring from other banking groups, as well as opening new branches by the bank itself. In 2004, Banca Antoniana Popolare Veneta sold 30 branches to Banca Nuova.

A subsidiary (later sister company), PrestiNuova S.p.A., was found in 2005. The company was specialized in secured loan (by a fifth of salary). As of 31 December 2009, Banca Nuova owned 88.67% shares. The other shareholders at that time were parent company BPVi (6.34%) and fellow Sicilian bank Banca Popolare Sant'Angelo (5%).

On 1 March 2011, the old legal person of Banca Nuova was replaced by another of the same name, the latter was incorporated on 31 August 2010. After the deal, PrestiNuova became a sister company of Banca Nuova, instead of a subsidiary, which BPVi owned 95% and reaching 100% of the shares in 2013.

Banca Nuova and its parent company BPVi suffered from capital shortfall in 2016 (for example, Banca Nuova's CET1 capital ratio was 6.74% at 31 December 2015, barely above the requirement; same condition in the parent company (Group's CET1 ratio was 6.65%)). After the failure of the initial public offering of its shares since it became a società per azioni, the parent company was bail-out by its underwriter Atlante in mid-2016 for about €1.5 billion, which replaced UniCredit as underwriter.

As part of the scandal of the parent company BPVi in 2016–17, the bank was suffered from lawsuit regarding mis-selling of the shares of BPVi to the depositors of the bank, during which the parent company was a cooperative (Italian: società cooperativa per azioni).

After the financial condition of BPVi deteriorated further, it was declared by the European Central Bank (the supervisor of BPVi) that the banking group was insolvent in 2017. An Italian government funded bail-out of the depositors (and bail-in of the investor of BPVi) saw Intesa Sanpaolo, the second largest banking group of Italy by total assets, acquire most of the good assets and liabilities of BPVi, as well as Banca Nuova. However, it was also announced on 26 October, that the bank would be absorbed by Intesa Sanpaolo as branches, losing its brand and the separate incorporated status. The merger plan was approved by the board of directors of Intesa Sanpaolo on 5 February 2018.

A public version of a decision of the Italian Competition Authority, revealed that the bank (as part of BPVi), had a market share in terms of deposits (Italian: raccolta bancaria), 5–10% in the Province of Trapani, as well as 0–5% in other 8 provinces of Sicily before the merger; the same decision also revealed that BPVi (through Banca Nuova and sister company) had a market share, in terms of lending to families (Italian: impieghi bancari (famiglie consumatrici)), 10–20% in the Province of Trapani and 5–10% in the Provinces of Agrigento, Caltanissetta, Enna, Messina, Palermo and 0–5% in the Provinces of Catania, Ragusa and Syracuse (Siracusa).

On 11 July 2017 it was also announced that Banca Nuova had sold back some of the non-performing loans back to BPVi which now acted as a bad bank.

== Sister companies ==
=== PrestiNuova ===
PrestiNuova was a subsidiary of Banca Nuova but later a sister company. It specialized in consumer loan. As of 31 December 2016, the company had a CET1 capital ratio of 10.09%, total assets of €354 million and a net equity of €42 million. The remaining 5% shares of PrestiNuova was acquired from Banca Popolare Sant'Angelo in 2013, for about €1.9 million.

=== FarmaNuova ===
Banca Nuova also owned 30% shares of associate company FarmaNuova in 2009. The company was dedicated to pharmacies. FarmaNuova was absorbed by sister company FarBanca in 2012.

== Sponsorship ==
The bank was a sponsor of basketball team Pallacanestro Trapani, football clubs U.S. Città di Palermo and Trapani Calcio (until the 2015–16 season).

== See also ==
- Banco di Sicilia, former subsidiary of UniCredit
- Banco Popolare Siciliano, a brand of Banco Popolare
- Credito Siciliano, a subsidiary of Credito Valtellinese
- Banca Agricola Popolare di Ragusa, a cooperative bank
- Banca Popolare Sant'Angelo, a cooperative bank
- Banca Carime, former subsidiary of UBI Banca
- List of banks in Italy
