= Italfondiario =

Italfondiario S.p.A. formerly known as Istituto Italiano di Credito Fondiario, is a bank that specializes in management of non-performing loans.

== History ==
The bank was founded in 1891. In 1999 it was transformed into a bank that specializes in credit management. In 2000 it was acquired by a private fund of Fortress Investment Group. In 2016, it was merged with doBank, a bank 50% owned by Eurocastle Investment, another fund of Fortress.
