= Banco Popolare Siciliano =

Italian bank

- Company type: Brand and internal division
- Number of locations: Over 120 (2016)
- Owner: Banco Popolare (100%)
- Website: www.bpsiciliano.it

Banco Popolare Siciliano is a brand used by Banco Popolare in Sicily.

== History ==
=== Predecessors ===
Banco Popolare Group had presented in Sicily since 1990s due to merger and acquisitions. According to Banca d'Italia data on 30 September 1999, Banca Popolare di Lodi (BPL) had 118 branches on the island, accounted for 7.3% of the total number of branches on the island. It was the second-largest banking network on the island, behind Banco di Sicilia which had a 34% market share. The sum of second to sixth largest banks on the island, was still smaller than Banco di Sicilia.

In 2006, a year before the formation of Banco Popolare, Banco Popolare di Verona e Novara had 17 branches on the island, as well as more than 100 branches of Banca Popolare Italiana (ex-BPL). In 2007, the merger of BPVN and BPI made Banco Popolare had 143 branches on the island, which was increased to 145 in the next year. In the same year Banca Popolare di Novara transferred all its 18 branches to Banca Popolare di Lodi, which the subsidiary was specialized in Lombardy (part), Romagna and Sicily. In 2010, the branches were reduced to 127.

=== The creation of Banco Popolare Siciliano ===
In 2011, BPV, BPL and BPN were ceased to be a company but a division of Banco Popolare. In 2012, the department Banco Popolare Siciliano was created and managed by the bank division of BPN.

== See also ==
- Banca Agricola Popolare di Ragusa, an Italian bank
- Banca Nuova, a subsidiary of Banca Popolare di Vicenza
- Banca Popolare Sant'Angelo, an Italian bank
- Credito Siciliano, a subsidiary of Credito Valtellinese
- Banco di Sicilia, a defunct subsidiary of UniCredit
