= Cassa di Risparmio di Trieste =

Italian savings bank (1842–2002)

Cassa di Risparmio di Trieste Banca
- Formerly: Cassa di Risparmio di Trieste
- Type: Subsidiary (since 1992); Società per azioni (since 1992)
- Industry: Financial services
- Founded: 1842; 1992 (as S.p.A.); 1996 (Croatia subsidiary)
- Defunct: 2002
- Fate: merged to form single brand UniCredit
- Successor: UniCredit Banca (Italy branches); Zagrebačka banka (Croatia branches); other UniCredit divisions; Fondazione CRTrieste (charity function); Banca Generali (bank license of a subsidiary)
- Headquarters: Trieste, Italy
- Number of locations: 52 (2001)
- Area served: Italy and Croatia
- Net income: €17million (2001)
- Total equity: €219million (2001)
- Owner: UniCredit (79.67%)
- Website: www.crtrieste.it

Cassa di Risparmio di Trieste was an Italian savings bank headquartered in Trieste that operated between 1842 and 2002.

In 1992, as part of the Italian government restructuring of public credit institutions, known as the Legge Amato, the bank was split into three organizations: Cassa di Risparmio di Trieste - Banca S.p.A., its subsidiary in special credito and Fondazione CRTrieste.

Cassa di Risparmio di Trieste - Banca S.p.A. joined newly formed banking group UniCredit in 1999. The bank, as a brand and subsidiary, survived within UniCredit until 2002 when it was merged with 6 other sub-brands to form UniCredit Banca and other divisions of UniCredit.

== History ==
Founded in 1842 in the Imperial Free City of Trieste, in the Austrian Empire. The city later became the capital of the Austrian Littoral of the empire and belongs to the Kingdom of Italy since 1921. Since joined Italy, the bank merged with other savings bank such as bank from Postumia due to a decree-law enacted in 1927. (Postumia belongs to Italy between the two world war, but now located in Slovenia.)

A report by Mediobanca, shown the bank was ranked 75th by total assets in 1988, among all type of commercial banks of Italy.

In 1992, due to Legge Amato, the bank was split into two organizations, a società per azioni (s.p.a.) and a banking foundation. At first the S.p.A. had a share capital of 220 billion lire.

In 1998, The Economist credited the bank as "Italy's most successful international bank" for its cross-border banking subsidiary Trscanska Stedionica – Banka. In the same year, a subsidiary, Cassa di Risparmio di Trieste Specialcredito, which specialize in credito fondiario such as public works and medium-long-term loan, was sold to Assicurazioni Generali, which became Banca Generali. Before the handover of the company, the medium-long-term loan business was sold back to Cassa di Risparmio di Trieste.

In 1999, the banking foundation sold the controlling interests of the bank (s.p.a.) to UniCredit. As of 31 December 2001, the foundation retained 20% shares of the S.p.A., as well as owned 0.79% shares of UniCredit. The foundation also owned a private equity fund "Fondo Gestiveneto 6", which was managed by Pioneer Investments of UniCredit group.

In 2002 the S.p.A. was absorbed by Credito Italiano; the legal person of Credito Italiano then renamed into UniCredit Banca, as the new retail arm of the banking group. Several subsidiaries were also spin off from UniCredit Banca in 2003 as separate entities of the group.

The Croatian subsidiary of C.R. Trieste was merged into Zagrebačka banka, while C.R. Trieste Ireland was liquidated, as it was overlapped with UniCredit Bank Ireland (UniCredito Italiano Bank (Ireland) plc).

== Subsidiaries ==
As of 31 December 2001

- C.R. Trieste Ireland Ltd. (99.99%)
- Cassa di Risparmio di Trieste – Banca d.d. Zagreb (Croatian: Trscanska Stedionica – Banka d.d. Zagreb, 83.95%)
- Cassa di Risparmio di Trieste – Specialcredito S.p.A. (former)

== Equity investments ==
As of 31 December 2001

- The Bank of Italy (0.44%)
- Friulia (1.27%)
- Friulia-Lis (2.25%))
- Liseuro (35.11%)

== Banking foundation ==
After the bank became defunct, the charity function, as well as the bank's arts collection survived as an organization Fondazione Cassa di Risparmio di Trieste or Fondazione CRTrieste. As of 31 December 2016, the foundation had an equity of €204 million. The foundation write-down the value of the shares of UniCredit its owned (17,444,018 number of shares before 2017 reverse stock split; 0.282%), as well as the shares of Banca Mediocredito del Friuli Venezia Giulia (34,440,610 number of shares; 30.502%). In addition, the foundation owned 875,977 number of shares (0.256%) of Cassa Depositi e Prestiti as well as other investment, such as FriulAdria, Fincantieri (0.071%) and GEDI Gruppo Editoriale.

== See also ==
- Cassa di Risparmio del Friuli Venezia Giulia, a subsidiary of Intesa Sanpaolo
- Banca Popolare di Trieste, a co-operative bank that was acquired by Banca Popolare di Vicenza
- List of banks in Italy
