= Banca Mediocredito del Friuli Venezia Giulia =

- Native name: Banca Mediocredito del Friuli Venezia Giulia S.p.A.
- Type: Public private partnership
- Industry: Financial services
- Founded: 31 July 1957; 69 years ago
- Headquarters: 1 via Aquileia, Udine, Italy
- Area served: Friuli – Venezia Giulia region
- Net income: ▲ (€28,513,482) (2014)
- Total assets: ▼€1,961,350,206 (2014)
- Total equity: ▲€188,899,847 (2014)
- Owner: Finanziaria MC (54.99%); Fondazione CR Trieste (30.50%); Finanziaria BCC Friuli Venezia Giulia (4.39%)
- Parent: Friuli – Venezia Giulia region (ultimate); Finanziaria Friuli Venezia Giulia (indirect); Finanziaria Mediocredito (direct)
- Capital ratio: 11.76% (CET1)
- Website: Official website

Banca Mediocredito del Friuli Venezia Giulia S.p.A. is an Italian commercial bank based in Udine, Friuli – Venezia Giulia region.

== History ==
Istituto di Credito per il Finanziamento a Medio Termine alle Medie e Piccole Industrie Situate nel Territorio della Provincia di Udine was found on 31 July 1957 to provide medium-term loan to the companies of the Province of Udine, as an ente di diritto pubblico. It was part of the Mediocredito initiative. The bank later expanded to cover the whole Friuli – Venezia Giulia region. The bank at first had 1.340 billion lire capital, provided by central government (1 billion lire) and the banks in north-eastern Italy. (Cassa di Risparmio di Udine, Banca Cattolica del Veneto, Banca del Friuli, Banca Popolare Cooperativa Udinese, Banca Popolare Cooperativa di Pordenone and Cassa San Giuseppe di Pordenone.)

Due to Legge Amato Mediocredito del Friuli – Venezia Giulia was transformed into a "company limited by shares" (Italian: società per azioni) on 3 May 1993 (gazetted on 21 May). The bank also established Medioleasing Friuli – Venezia Giulia in 1994, as well as acquiring Friulia Lis from indirect parent company Finanziaria Regionale Friuli Venezia Giulia (Friulia).

== Shareholders ==
- Finanziaria Mediocredito in liquidation (Friuli – Venezia Giulia region & Friulia S.p.A.)
- Fondazione Cassa di Risparmio di Trieste
- Finanziaria delle Banche di Credito Cooperativo del Friuli Venezia Giulia e per lo sviluppo del territori
- Banca Popolare FriulAdria
- Banca Popolare di Cividale
- Confindustria Udine
- UniCredit
- Cassa di Risparmio del Friuli Venezia Giulia
- Unione Industriali Pordenone
- Assicurazioni Generali
- Banco di Brescia
- Veneto Banca
- Banca Intermobiliare
- ASCOM Servizi S.r.l.
- Istituto Nazionale per l'Assicurazione Contro gli Infortuni sul Lavoro
