= Pordenonelegge.it =

Pordenonelegge.it, festa del libro con gli autori (Italian for: "PordenoneReads: Celebrating Books and their Authors", simply known as Pordenonelegge) is a book festival held yearly in the Northern Italian town of Pordenone. The Pordenone book festival takes place over one week each September. 2015 saw its sixteenth edition.

== History and guests ==
pordenonelegge.it has hosted Italian alongside international authors of both fiction and non-fiction. Some of the guests include writer Luis Sepúlveda, philosophers Richard Rorty and Peter Singer, scientists Margherita Hack and Giacomo Rizzolatti, as well as Nobel prize winner J. M. Coetzee.

pordenonelegge is not hosted in a single venue, but rather in the whole downtown of Pordenone, both outdoors and indoors, as more exhibitions, interviews and lectures take place simultaneously. More than 200 authors are hosted each year.

The trademark color of the Pordenone book festival is yellow. Many local young people serve as volunteers. They are known as "guardian angels" as they wear yellow t-shirts with angel wings printed on the back.

The Pordenone book festival has gained national attention along the years, developing into acultural events in Italy.

pordenonelegge.it has positively affected the economic development of Pordenone and its province.

The artistic director is the poet Gian Mario Villalta.
