= Joint European Resources for Micro to Medium Enterprises =

Joint European Resources for Micro to Medium Enterprises or JEREMIE is an initiative of the European Commission in cooperation with the European Investment Fund to support private businesses in select member states.
