= Banco di Sicilia =

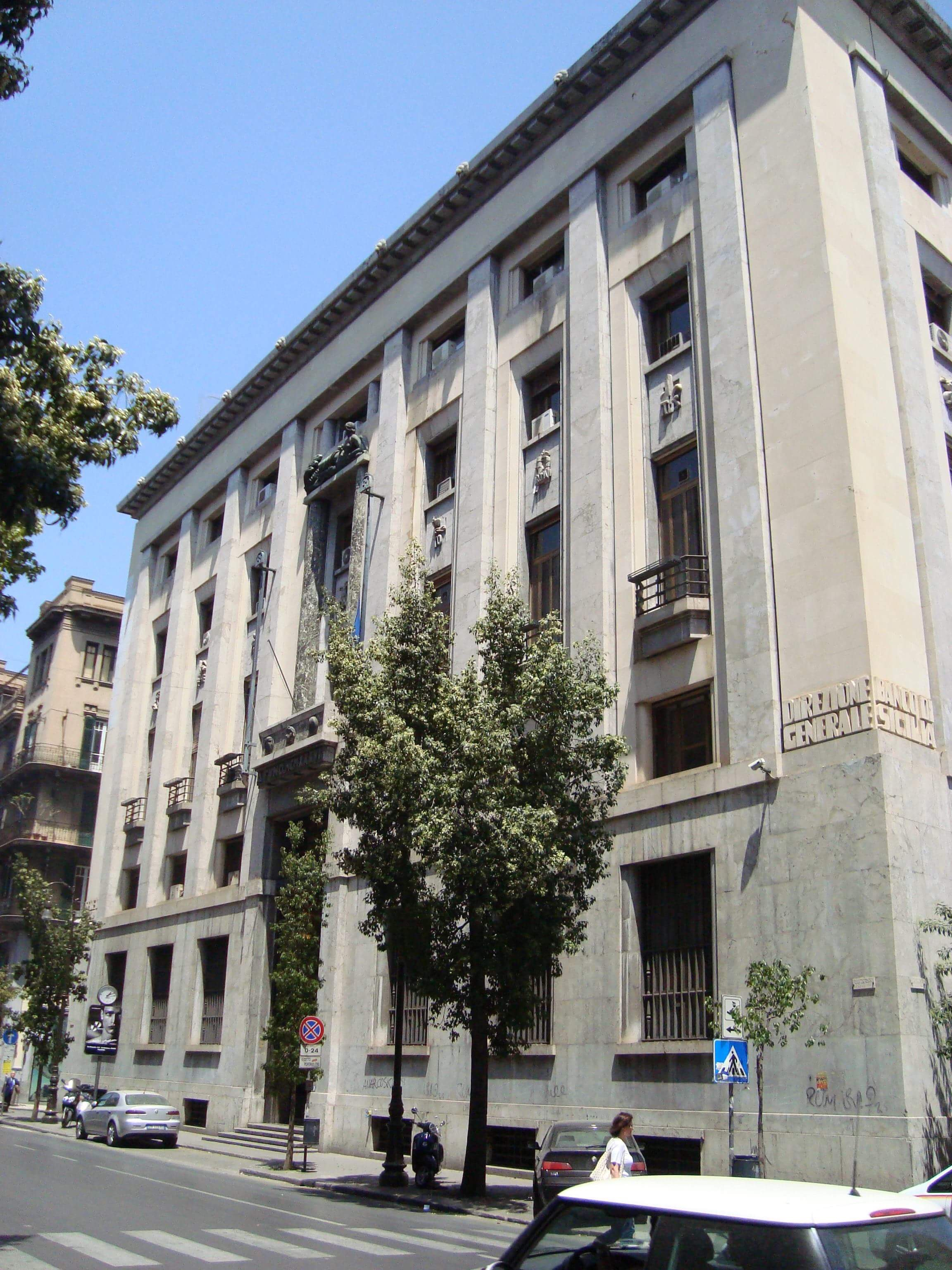
- Head office building in Palermo
- Native name: Banco di Sicilia
- Type: Private company
- Industry: Banking
- Founded: 1850
- Defunct: 2010
- Fate: Absorbed by parent company
- Headquarters: Palermo, Italy
- Number of locations: 425 branches (2009)
- Area served: Sicily
- Services: Retail banking
- Parent: UniCredit (100%)

Banco di Sicilia was an Italian bank based in Palermo, Sicily. It was a subsidiary of UniCredit but absorbed into the parent company in 2010.

== History ==
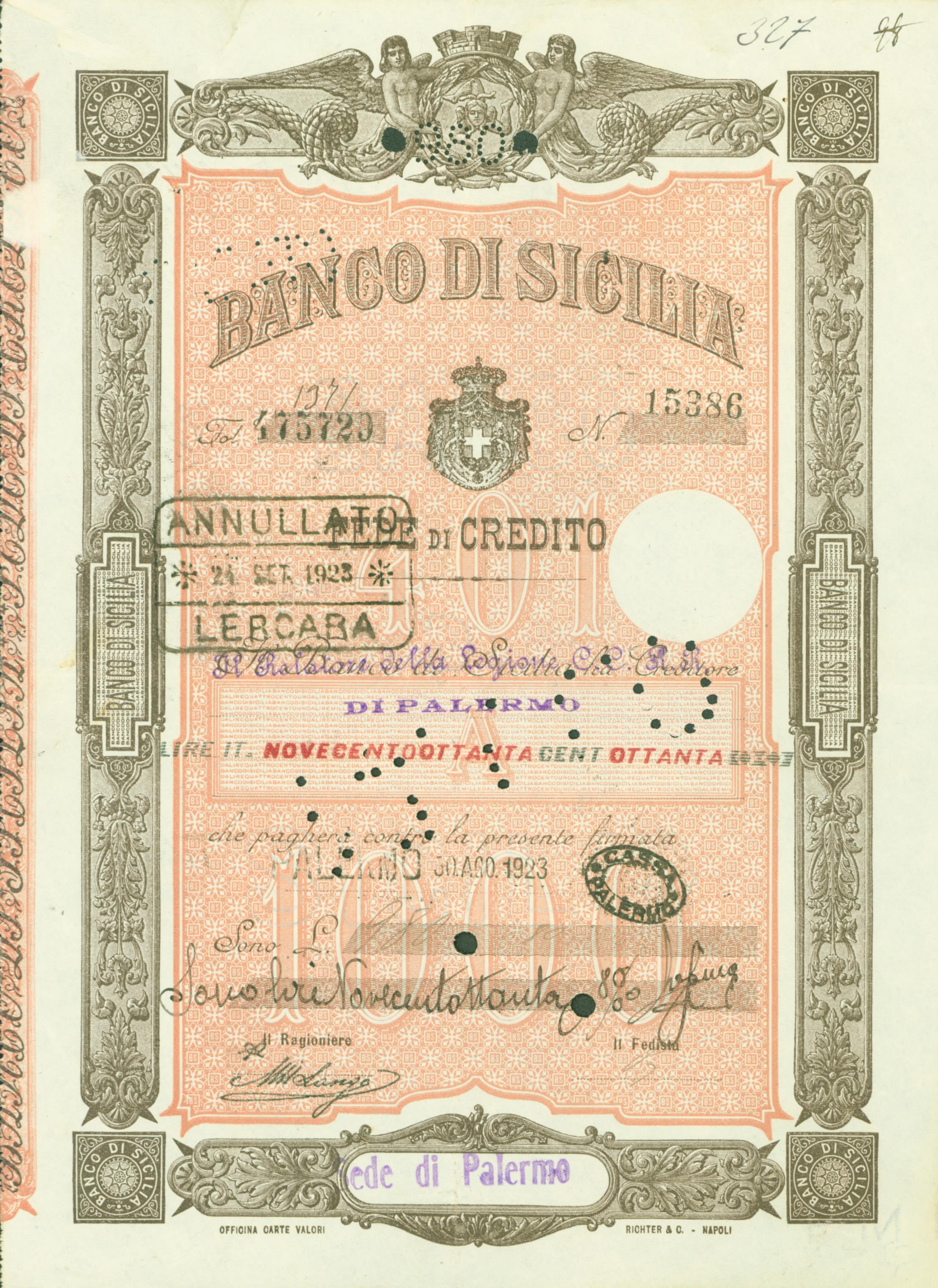
Fede di Credito of the Banco di Sicilia, issued 30 August 1923

It was founded as Banco Regio dei Reali Domini al di là del Faro in 1849 and was renamed in 1860. From 1867 to 1926 the Banco di Sicilia was granted permission to issue legal tender currency (along with Bank of Italy and Banco di Napoli).

As a public institution it was among the largest banks in Italy, with foreign branches and subsidiaries in the United States (Trust Company Bank of Sicily), Libya (Sahara Bank), United Kingdom, Germany, Denmark, France and UAE.

In 1997 it acquired Sicilcassa, at the same time the capital increase of Banco di Sicilia was subscribed by Mediocredito Centrale.

In 1999 Mediocredito Centrale Group was acquired by Banca di Roma. Banco di Sicilia became a subsidiary of the group. According to the Bank of Italy, Banco di Sicilia had market shares of 34% at that time in the island, in terms of branches. The sum of the branches of the second to sixth largest banking group in the island was still lower than 34%. (Banca Popolare di Lodi, Banca Antonveneta, Banca Commerciale Italiana, Banca Monte dei Paschi di Siena and Banca Popolare Sant'Angelo)

In 2002 Banco di Roma merged with Bipop Carire to form Capitalia. In 2007 Capitalia was acquired by UniCredit, which Banco di Sicilia became its subsidiary instead.

In 2008, 20 branches of the bank were sold to Banca Carige.

In 2010, UniCredit Banca, Banco di Sicilia and Banca di Roma were absorbed into the parent company UniCredit.

As at 31 December 2009, Banco di Sicilia had a total assets of €14,921,651,349 and a shareholders' equity of €422,168,345.

== See also ==
- Banca Agricola Popolare di Ragusa, an Italian bank
- Banca Nuova, a subsidiary of Banca Popolare di Vicenza
- Banco Popolare Siciliano
- Credito Siciliano, a subsidiary of Credito Valtellinese
- List of banks in Italy

== Bibliography ==
- Colajanni, Napoleone (1995). Storia della banca in Italia: da Cavour a Ciampi. Newton. ISBN 978-8881830633.
