= Credito Artigiano =

Credito Artigiano was an Italian bank based in Milan, Lombardy. it was absorbed by Credito Valtellinese in 2012.

== History ==
Credito Artigiano was found in Milan in 1946. Since 1995 it was a subsidiary of Credito Valtellinese (Creval). In 1999 it was listed in Borsa Italiana. In 1999 Creval owned 54.01% shares of Credito Artigiano. In 2000 Credito Artigiano acquired 51% shares of Banca dell'Artigianato e dell'Industria and 76.94% stake of Banca Regionale Sant'Angelo (ex-Nuova Banca del Monte Sant'Agata) in 2001. In 2002 Credito Valtellinese increased its ownership on the bank to 63.34% (buying 5% from Cattolica Assicurazioni). It was increased to 65.04% in 2003, 65.50% in 2004, 65.72% in 2005, 69.82% in 2008, 69.85% in 2009, 69.88% in 2010, 72.14% in 2011.

Credito Artigiano jointed-control Credito Siciliano with the parent company Creval when the subsidiary was created in 2002 .

On 10 September 2012 Credito Artigiano was incorporated into Credito Valtellinese.

== See also ==
- List of banks in Italy
