= Credito Siciliano =

- Native name: Credito Siciliano
- Formerly: Nuova Banca del Monte Sant'Agata S.p.A.; Banca Regionale Sant'Angelo S.p.A.
- Type: subsidiary
- Industry: Financial services
- Predecessor: Monte Grande di Pietà di Sant'Agata; Monte di Credito su Pegno Sant'Agata; Banca del Monte Sant'Agata
- Founded: 17 December 1809 (predecessor); 25 May 1994 (S.p.A.); 1 January 2001 (Banca Regionale); 19 June 2002 (Credito Siciliano)
- Headquarters: Acireale, Italy
- Number of locations: 137 branches (2014)
- Area served: Sicily
- Services: Retail and corporate banking
- Net income: ▼ (€24 million) (2014)
- Total assets: ▼€3.969 billion (2014)
- Total equity: ▼€168 million (2014)
- Owner: Credito Valtellinese (98.0%)
- Parent: Credito Valtellinese
- Capital ratio: 6.74% (CET1)
- Website: Official website

Credito Siciliano was an Italian bank headquartered in Acireale, Sicily and previously Palermo. It was a subsidiary of Credito Valtellinese until its merger by incorporation into Credito Valtellinese in June 2018.

The bank had 136 branches, 133 located in Sicily (Province of Agrigento: 4; Province of Caltanissetta: 7; Province of Catania: 51; Province of Enna: 2; Province of Messina: 18; Province of Palermo: 26; Province of Ragusa: 9; Province of Siracusa: 6 and Province of Trapani: 10), plus 3 more in mainland Italy (Milan, Rome, Turin).

== Predecessors ==
=== Banca del Monte Sant'Agata ===
Three separate mounts of piety (Italian: monti di pietà) were founded in Catania, at that time part of the Kingdom of Sicily. Monte Grande di Pietà di Sant'Agata, the second mount of the city that named after St.Agatha of Sicily, was founded on 17 December 1809. The mount survived until the modern age of Italy, which was last known as Monte di Credito su Pegno – Banca del Monte Sant'Agata di Catania, a credit institution that was governor by TUB, the Italian banking law. The institute was in special administration (Italian: A.S.) from 1992. The institute was also under a.s. in 1981.

In 1994, a company limited by shares, was incorporated by the administrator as Nuova Banca del Monte Sant'Agata S.p.A., acquiring the assets and liabilities of the institute; the old institute was being liquidated (Italian: L.C.A.). The new legal person was later acquired by fellow Sicilian bank Banca Popolare Sant'Angelo.

=== Banca Regionale Sant'Angelo ===
Banca Regionale Sant'Angelo was an Italian bank based on 1/E via Siracusa, Palermo, Sicily. The bank was formed by Banca Popolare Sant'Angelo injected part of the bank assets to Nuova Banca del Monte Sant'Agata S.p.A. on 1 January 2001, as well as sold the company to Credito Artigiano (part of Credito Valtellinese group) in mid-2001, by the subscription of the capital increase of Banca Regionale Sant'Angelo, by Credito Artigiano. The shares of Banca Regionale Sant'Angelo was also distributed to the shareholders of Banca Popolare Sant'Angelo, making Credito Artigiano launched a public acquisition offer (Italian: OPA) to buy the remaining 55% shares of the Banca Regionale in 2001. In 2002, Banca Regionale Sant'Angelo absorbed other subsidiaries of Credito Valtellinese to form Credito Siciliano.

The former headquarters of Banca Monte Sant'Agata on via Sant'Euplio, Catania, was sold to a company. The site was refurbished as a hotel.

=== Leasingroup Sicilia ===
Leasingroup Sicilia was a finance leasing company based in Sicily. Banca Popolare Sant'Angelo increased it stake in the company in 1990s, but spin off to inject the stake to Banca Regionale Sant'Angelo circa 2001. As at 31 December 2001, Banca Popolare di Lodi also owned 5.12% stake.

== History ==
Credito Siciliano was formed on 1 July 2002 by the merger of Banca Popolare Santa Venera (a subsidiary of Credito Valtellinese), Banca Regionale Sant'Angelo (a subsidiary of Credito Artigiano), Leasingroup Sicilia (a subsidiary of Banca Regionale Sant'Angelo, with BP Santa Venera had a minority interests) and the retail division of Cassa San Giacomo (a subsidiary of Credito Valtellinese). The new bank was owned by Credito Valtellinese for 39.43% shares, as well as through its subsidiary Credito Artigiano for an additional 35.79% shares at that time. In 2008, the bank recorded a profit of 12.4 million euros.

In May 2018, the merger by incorporation of Credito Siciliano into Creval was approved, with the exchange ratio set at 78.35 new Creval shares. On 25 June 2018, the merger by incorporation into Credito Valtellinese became effective.

== See also ==
- List of banks in Italy

== See also ==
- Banca Agricola Popolare di Ragusa, an Italian bank
- Banca Nuova, a subsidiary of Banca Popolare di Vicenza
- Banco Popolare Siciliano, a brand of Banco Popolare
- Banco di Sicilia, a defunct UniCredit subsidiary
