= Mediocredito Italiano =

Italian commercial bank

MedioCredito Italiano S.p.A.
- Formerly: MedioCredito Lombardo; Banca Intesa MedioCredito; Banca IntesaBCI MedioCredito; Intesa MedioCredito
- Type: Subsidiary
- Industry: Financial services
- Founded: 1953; 73 years ago
- Founder: Cassa di Risparmio delle Provincie Lombarde
- Headquarters: 18 via Montebello, Milan, Italy
- Area served: Italy
- Key people: Roberto Mazzotta (Chairman); Rony Hamaui (Director-General)
- Services: Financial leasing, factoring and medium-term loan
- Net income: ▲ (€80,538,191.45) (2014)
- Total assets: ▼€47.986 billion (2014)
- Total equity: ▼€2.221 billion (2014)
- Owner: Intesa Sanpaolo (100%)
- Parent: Intesa Sanpaolo
- Capital ratio: ▲9.2% (CET1)
- Website: www.mediocreditoitaliano.com

MedioCredito Italiano S.p.A. (MCI) is an Italian commercial bank based in Milan, Lombardy.

== History ==
Istituto di credito per il finanziamento a medio termine alle piccole e medie industria della Lombardia, or MedioCredito Lombardo in short, was found in 1953 with Cassa di Risparmio delle Provincie Lombarde (Cariplo) as the major funder. It was part of the MedioCredito initiative. In January 1992 the bank had changed from statutory corporation (Italian: ente di diritto pubblico) to limited company (Italian: società per azioni). As at 31 December 1996, Cariplo Group was the major shareholders of Mediocredito Lombardo (79.37%). The rest was owned by banks in Italy, such as Banca Apulia (0.013%).

Cariplo Group also owned 42.07% shares of MedioCredito Abruzzese e Molisano and 42.32% shares of MedioCredito del Sud, which were absorbed into MedioCredito Lombardo in 1997 and 1999, respectively. In 1998 Banca Intesa also became the ultimate parent company of MedioCredito Lombardo.

In 1999–2000 Mediocredito Lombardo acquired the controlling interests of Credito Industriale Sardo from the Ministry of the Treasury (53.23%). In 2000, the bank was renamed to Banca Intesa MedioCredito, which became Banca IntesaBCI MedioCredito in 2001 to align with the name change of the bank group. In 2003 the bank reverted to use Banca Intesa MedioCredito as legal name, or Intesa MedioCredito in short.

In 2007 the parent company merged with Sanpaolo IMI to form Intesa Sanpaolo Group. In 2008 the bank was renamed to MedioCredito Italiano.

In 2014, Leasint, Centro Leasing, leasing division of Neos Finance, Mediofactoring, Centro Factoring and Agriventure were merged into MedioCredito Italiano.
