= Credito Valtellinese =

Former Italian banking company

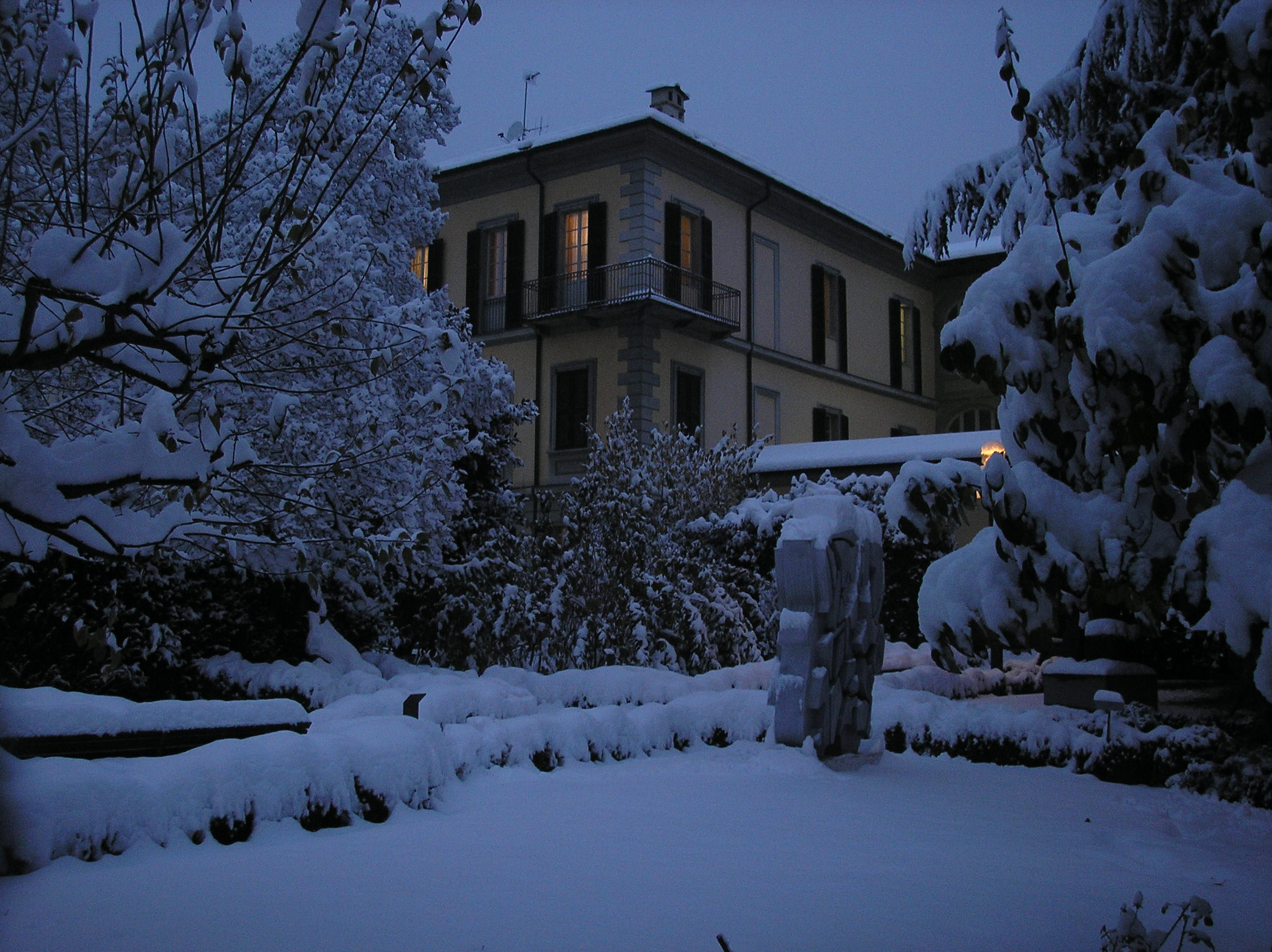
- Native name: Credito Valtellinese S.p.A.
- Formerly: Banca Piccolo Credito Valtellinese; Credito Valtellinese S.C.
- Type: listed società per azioni
- Traded as: BIT: CVAL; FTSE Italia Small Cap Component
- ISIN: IT0005319444
- Industry: Financial services
- Founded: 1908
- Headquarters: Sondrio and Milan, Italy
- Services: Retail & corporate banking; insurance agent & brokering
- Net income: ▲€+113.2 million (2020)
- Total assets: ▼€23.882 billion (2020)
- Total equity: ▲€1.774 billion (2020)
- Owner: others
- Number of employees: 3521 (2020)
- Subsidiaries: Credito Siciliano (98.54%); Global Assicurazioni (60%); Global Broker (51%); Stelline Real Estate (100%)
- Capital ratio: ▲19.6% (CET1)
- Website: www.gruppocreval.com
- Footnotes in a consolidated basis

Credito Valtellinese (known as Creval) was an Italian bank based in Sondrio (in Lombardy, Italy) prior to its acquisition by Crédit Agricole Italia in 2021. The company was a former component of the FTSE Italia Mid Cap Index of the Borsa Italiana (Milan Stock Exchange), but was removed and added as a component of the FTSE Italia Small Cap Index in May 2017; the bank was added back to the reserve list of the FTSE Italia Mid Cap Index in August 2017.

The bank was named after the area Valtellina. The bank had 363 branches in Northern Italy (as Credito Valtellinese), 40 branches in Marche and Umbria (former Carifano), and 133 branches in Sicily (as Credito Siciliano). Credito Siciliano had three more branches outside the island of Sicily.

As of 30 June 2014, it had a market share of 32% in Sondrio, but only 2.9% of the whole Lombardy region in terms of deposits and 1.7% in terms of branches, ranking 10th in Italy.

Since 2021, it has been part of Crédit Agricole Italia after a successful takeover bid by Crédit Agricole Italia. Crédit Agricole successfully concludes the tender offer, acquiring 91.17% of the shares in Creval, for a cost of 855 million. The delisting from the Italian Stock Exchange took place on Friday 4 June 2021 following the success of the residual takeover bid and the consequent "squeeze-out", which led Crédit Agricole to hold 100% of the capital of Creval.

== History ==
Credito Valtellinese is a former cooperative bank based in Sondrio, founded in 1908 as Banca Piccolo Credito Valtellinese. (Not to be confused with Banca Popolare di Sondrio) The bank expanded by the acquisition of Technoleasing (later Bancaperta) in the 1980s, and Credito Artigiano in 1996, which was the parent company of Banca dell'Artigianato e dell'Industria. In 2002, Sicilian banks Banca Popolare Santa Venera in Acireale, Cassa San Giacomo in Caltagirone and Banca Regionale Sant'Angelo were merged to become Credito Siciliano. In 2008, Credito Piemontese, Cassa di Risparmio di Fano, Banca Cattolica di Montefiascone and Credito del Lazio (former Banca della Ciociaria) joined.

From 2004 to 2013, Creval was a minority shareholder of Banca di Cividale.

In 2016, the bank was demutualized, being registered as a Banca Popolare. The new Italian Law N°3/2015 required that banks with more than €8 billion total assets in that category had to be transformed into a società per azioni. The withdrawal price for the shareholders was set at €0.4747 per share. At the same time, a plan was announced to combine 10 old shares into 1 new share.

== See also ==
- List of banks in Italy
