= DoValue =

doValue
- Native name: doValue S.p.A.
- Formerly: Istituto di Credito Fondiario delle Venezie; Mediovenezie Banca; UniCredito Gestione Crediti; UniCredit Credit Management Bank; doBank
- Type: listed società per azioni
- Traded as: BIT: DOV; FTSE Italia Small Cap Component
- ISIN: IT0001044996
- Industry: Financial services
- Founded: 1949
- Headquarters: Verona, Italy
Key people
Giovanni Castellaneta	(Chairman)
Andrea Mangoni	(CEO)
- Net income: ▲€52.330 million (2016)
- Total assets: ▼€328.434 million (2016)
- Total equity: ▲€210.744 million (2016)
Owner
SoftBank Group (as private equity fund manager via Avio S.à r.l. and Fortress Investment Group)	(50.1% ordinary share)
Jupiter Asset Management	(7.7% ordinary share)
Parent
Avio S.à r.l.	(direct)
Fortress Investment Group	(indirect)
SoftBank Group	(ultimate)
- Subsidiaries: Italfondiario (100%)
- Capital ratio: ▲21% (Group CET1, Dec.2016)
- Website: www.dovalue.it

doValue S.p.A. formerly doBank S.p.A. is an Italian financial service company based in Verona, Veneto region. The company, a former bank, was known as UniCredit Credit Management Bank until 2015. In 2015, the company was acquired by private equity funds of Fortress Investment Group. Soon after the company started their initial public offering; the bank became a component of FTSE Italia Mid Cap Index in August 2017.

== History ==
=== Mediovenezie Banca ===
Istituto di Credito Fondiario delle Venezie was founded in 1949 as a bank that specializes in financing public works and public utility. In 1992, the bank was transformed from a statutory corporation to "company limited by shares" (Italian: società per azioni) as Credito Fondiario delle Venezie S.p.A.. In 1995, the bank merged with Mediocredito delle Venezie (a bank specializing in medium-term lending to industries) and Federalcasse Banca (an inter-bank lending institute for Veneto savings banks) to form Mediovenezie Banca. The bank was part of Cariverona Banca Group. In 1995, it became part of Unicredito Group, which in 1998, became part of UniCredito Italiano Group.

=== UniCredit Credit Management Bank ===
In 2000, the lending business of Mediovenezie was transferred to sister company, while the bank itself had transformed into UniCredito Gestione Crediti, a bank specializing in credit management (Italian: gestione crediti).

In 2008, the bank was renamed into UniCredit Credit Management Bank which also managed the non-performing loans (NPLs) of former Capitalia Group. In 2011, UniCredit Credit Management absorbed Aspra Finance S.p.A..

At 31 December 2012, the book value of the company was valued as €3.3 billion. In 2013, UniCredit write-down €620 million for the value of UniCredit Credit Management, to €2.7 billion. In 2014, a further write-down of €1.5 million was made.

=== doBank ===
In 2015, UniCredit Credit Management, along with a portfolio of €2.4 billion gross book value of NPLs was sold to private equity fund of Fortress Investment Group (Eurocastle Investment Limited for 50% stake in doBank and NPLs) and Prelios for an undisclosed amount. The NPLs assets of doBank was separately owned by Romeo SPV S.r.l. on 30 September 2016, which doBank owned 5% of the SPV, Eurocastle Investment owned 47.5% directly (additional 2.5% via doBank) and the rest (47.5%) was owned by other shareholders.

In 2016, Italfondiario was acquired by doBank from Fortress.

In 2017, doBank became a listed company.

=== doValue ===
In June 2019, the company was renamed to doValue and withdrew its banking license. At the end of June 2019, doValue acquired 85% of Altamira Asset Management, active in the problematic credit sector and present in Spain, Portugal, Cyprus, Greece, for 360 million.

On June 5, 2020, it completed the purchase from Eurobank for 211 million euros of 80% of Fps, a Greek servicing company.
