= Banca di Credito Sardo =

Defunct Italian bank based in Sardinia

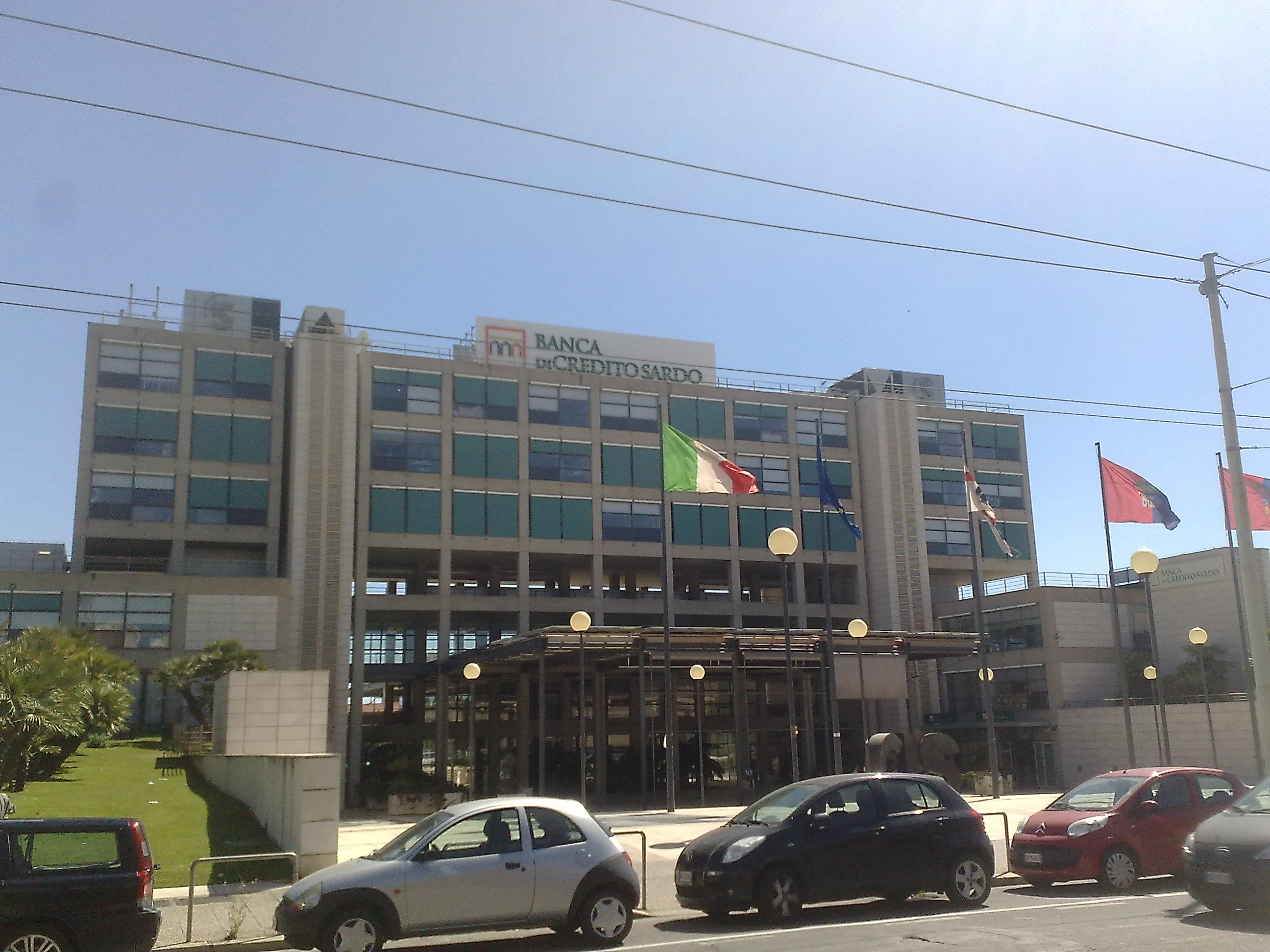
- The banks head office in 2013
- Formerly: Credito Industriale Sardo and Banca CIS
- Company type: S.p.A. Subsidiary of a listed company
- Industry: Financial services
- Founded: 1953
- Defunct: 2014
- Fate: Merged and absorbed
- Successor: Intesa Sanpaolo
- Headquarters: Cagliari, Sardinia, Italy
- Number of locations: 90 branches (2013)
- Area served: The island of Sardinia
- Services: Banking services, retail and corporate Banking
- Owner: Intesa Sanpaolo (100%)
- Number of employees: 1,022 (2013)
- Capital ratio: 15.81% (Tier 1)
- Website: bancadicreditosardo.it

The Banca di Credito Sardo was an Italian bank headquartered in Cagliari, Sardinia. In 2014, it was absorbed into their parent company Intesa Sanpaolo. The head office building, located in Cagliari, was designed by the Italian architect Renzo Piano.

== History ==
The bank was founded as Credito Industriale Sardo, ente di diritto pubblico con personalità giuridica propria in 1953 as one of the 19 Mediocredito of Italy, as well as one of the three Istituti per il Finanziamento a Medio Terminealle Medie e Piccole Industrie nell'Italia Meridionale e Insulare (Istituti Meridionale), which were funded by Cassa per il Mezzogiorno. The bank provided medium term loans to small and medium industries from the island.

Due to 1990s Italian law to restructure credit institutions, known as Legge Amato, the bank became a limited company (Italian: Società per Azioni) in 1992. The bank renamed into Banca CIS in the 1990s but remained a regional bank focussed on Sardinia. In 2000 Mediocredito Lombardo, a subsidiary of Banca Intesa, acquired an additional 53.23% stake of Banca CIS from the Ministry of the Treasury, making Mediocredito Lombardo owned 55.37% stake. This led to an end of partial state ownership of the bank which the Treasury Ministry had held since 1971.

In February 2009, the 93 branches of Intesa Sanpaolo and Banca CIS were merged to form Banca di Credito Sardo. The merger was formally announced and published within the Italian Gazzetta Ufficiale. At the same time the core business (medium term lending to enterprises) was transferred to Mediocredito Italiano (ex-Mediocredito Lombardo). However, Banca di Credito Sardo was absorbed into Intesa Sanpaolo in 2014.

== See also ==
- Banco di Sardegna
- List of banks in Italy
