= Industrial Development Bank =

Industrial Development Bank can refer to several banks of the same name:

- Industrial Development Bank of Pakistan
- Industrial Development Bank of Turkey, also known as TSKB
- IDBI Bank of India
- Industrial Development Bank, the former name of the Business Development Bank of Canada
