= Dario Scannapieco =

Italian economist

- Born: 18 August 1967 (age 59); Rome, Italy
- Education: LUISS Guido Carli; Harvard Business School
- Occupations: Economist and business executive
- Known for: CEO and General Director of Cassa Depositi e Prestiti

Dario Scannapieco (born 18 August 1967) is an Italian economist and business executive who has served as the CEO of Cassa Depositi e Prestiti (CDP) since June 2021.

== Education ==
In 1992, Scannapieco obtained a bachelor's degree in economics from LUISS Guido Carli in Rome. In 1997, he obtained a master's degree in business administration from Harvard Business School.

== Career ==
Scannapieco began his career in 1992 within the Planning and Strategic Control Department of Telecom Italia. Three years later, he joined the Council of Experts of the Italian Ministry of Treasure. From 2002 to 2007, he was general director of Finance and Privatizations of the Department of Treasury of the Italian Ministry of Economy and Finance.

In 2007, he was appointed as vice president of the European Investment Bank (EIB), and from 2012 to 2021, he was also chairman of the board of the European Investment Fund, in which the EIB is a majority shareholder. During this period, he was in charge of the Investment Plan for Europe (also known as the Juncker Plan).

Since 1 June 2021, Scannapieco has been the CEO and general director of the Italian bank Cassa Depositi e Prestiti. He was appointed CEO of CDP Reti the following month. According to Bloomberg News, Scannapieco has been an associate of Italian economist and former prime minister Mario Draghi since the 1990s. Additionally, Draghi selected him as the leader of the state lender institution, a position described in the same outlet as "one of Italy’s highest-profile corporate posts". As Giorgia Meloni assumed power in late 2022, political observers discussed Scannapieco as a potential technocratic cabinet member, namely minister of finance. Ultimately the position was occupied by Lega Nord politician Giancarlo Giorgetti. Euronews reported that Scannapieco had declined the position.

== Other positions ==
Between 1997 and 2007, Scannapieco held the following additional positions:

- Board member of Consap (Concessionaria Servizi Assicurativi Pubblici), Ente Tabacchi Italiani and Finmeccanica
- Member of the strategic steering committee of CDP
- Member of the advisory board of Spencer Stuart Italia
- Member of the strategic steering committee of the Agenzia del Demanio (Italian Public Property Agency)
- Commissioner for the transformation of the Monopoli di Stato (Italian Excise, Customs and Monopolies Agency) into a public entity
- Technical secretary of the strategic steering committee for the development of the Italian Stock Exchange
- Member of the French-Italian intergovernmental commission for the construction of the Turin–Lyon high-speed railway and the Italian-Austrian commission for the construction of the new Brenner Tunnel

In March 2023, Scannapieco was appointed as member of the High Council of the Scuola di Politiche Economiche e Sociali Carlo Azeglio Ciampi.

Since July 2023, he has been president of the European Long Term Investors Association (ELTI), which assembles 32 of Europe's leading National Promotional Banks and Institutions, including the European Investment Bank.

== Personal life ==
Dario Scannapieco is originally from Maiori, a town on Italy's Amalfi Coast.

He is married and has two children.

== Publications ==
- Dario Scannapieco (2001). "Le Privatizzazioni in Italia: una riflessione a dieci anni dal rapporto presentato al Ministro del Tesoro Guido Carli". Guido Carli e le privatizzazioni dieci anni dopo (in Italian). Franco A. Grassini, LUISS. p. 155. ISBN 9788888047171.
- Dario Scannapieco; William I. Megginson (2009). "9. The financial and economic lessons of Italy's privatization program". Global Corporate Governance. Columbia University Press. pp. 177–195.
- Dario Scannapieco (2015). "18. La BEI: una lunga storia al servizio dell'economia italiana". La sfida europea. Riforme, crescita e occupazione (in Italian). Franco Angeli. pp. 182–185. ISBN 9788891730800.
- Dario Scannapieco (November 2015). A new boost for European Investments. International Forum of Sovereign Wealth Funds (IFSWF).
- Dario Scannapieco (February 2018). "Building resilience, creating new opportunities in the EU neighbourhood". Great Insights Magazine. Vol. 7, no. 1. The centre for Africa-Europe relations (ecdpm).

== Honours ==
Commander of the Order of Merit of the Italian Republic, awarded on 2 June 2009.
Grand Officer of the Order of Merit of the Italian Republic, awarded on 27 December 2020.
