= Scannapieco =

Scannapieco is an Italian surname from Campania, literally translating to 'sheep-killer'. Notable people with this surname include:

- Dario Scannapieco (born 1967), Italian economist and business executive
- Matthew Scannapieco (born 1944), American politician
