= QDB =

QDB may refer to:

- Qatar Development Bank, a Qatari bank based in Doha
- QDB, the China Railway Pinyin code for Qingdao North railway station, Shandong, China
