= Istituto per il Credito Sportivo e Culturale =

Italian public bank

Istituto per il Credito Sportivo
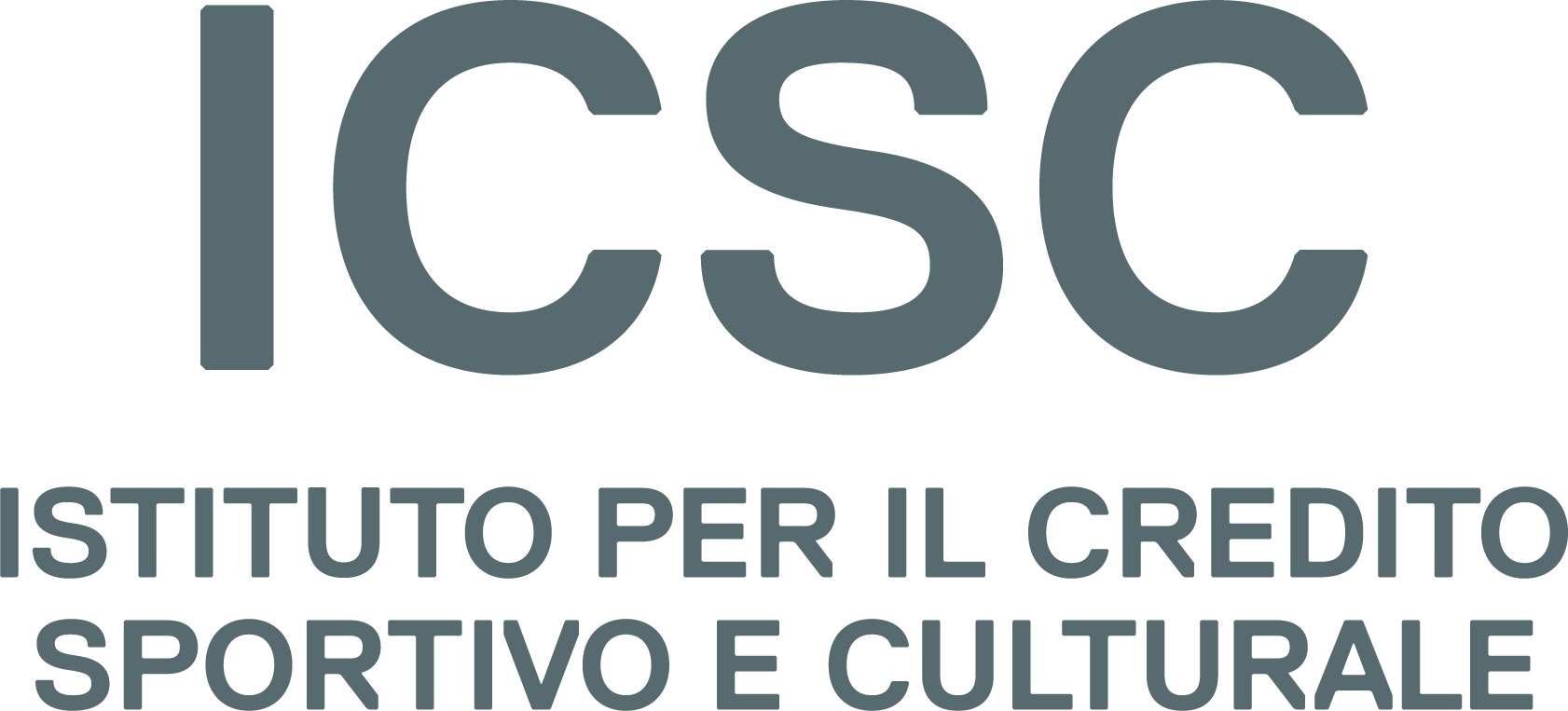
- Native name: Istituto per il Credito Sportivo
- Company type: Ente di diritto pubblico con gestione autonoma
- Headquarters: Rome, Italy
- Owner: Ministry of Economy and Finances (80.438%); Coni Servizi (6.702%); Crediop (3.110%); Cassa Depositi e Prestiti (2.214%); others
- Parent: Ministry of Economy and Finances
- Website: Official website

Istituto per il Credito Sportivo is an Italian public bank which was under special administration by Banca d'Italia since 2011.

According to new articles of association passed in 2014 (that superseded 2005 version), the bank was majority owned by Italian Ministry of Economy and Finances (80.438%), Cassa Depositi e Prestiti (2.214%) and Coni Servizi (a company owned by Ministry of Economy and Finances but associated with CONI) (6.702%) as well as other private banks: UniCredit, Banca Monte dei Paschi di Siena, Intesa Sanpaolo, Banca Nazionale del Lavoro, Assicurazioni Generali, Banco di Sardegna and Crediop. the new articles of association recalculated the ownership ratio, making private sectors had owned just 11% capital of the bank. The articles of association was also modified in 1993.

== Services ==
The bank was specialized in sports venue, for example a €60 million loan to Juventus FC S.p.A. for its Juventus Stadium project; The institution also formed a preliminary agreement with Cagliari of €17.5 million for the proposed new stadium in Elmas, as well as negotiated with Bologna for the re-built of Stadio Renato Dall'Ara. The institution loaned €20 million to Calcio Catania for its Torre del Grifo Village project in Mascalucia, as well as factoring the sponsorship income with F.C. Internazionale Milano for €24.8 million, and A.C. Milan for €17.5 million (2011–14).

== Shareholders ==
Despite a statutory corporation, Intesa Sanpaolo (previously Sanpaolo IMI and Banco di Napoli) and UniCredit (previously Capitalia and Banco di Sicilia) held 10.81% each in the institution until 2011, under a basis of €9,554,452 capital. However a change in the articles of association had made the private sector ownership ratio fell from 73% to approximately 11%, under a basis of €835,528,692 capital.

According to 2014 Articles of association, 45% profit would distributed as dividends and 50% went to increase in shareholders equity and a 5% either contributed to a special fund inside the institute dedicated to social and cultural activity. The change in status had affected the ownership ratio thus affected the ratio of distributed the dividends.

== Financial data ==
Year	Total Assets (in €)	Shareholders equity (in €)	Tier 1 capital ratio	net profit (in €)
2004	1,737,151,807	1,158,349,294	248%	40,348,010
2005	▲1,821,907,905	▼705,056,409	▼132%	▼35,643,966
2006
2007
2008
2009
2010	▲1,924,691,567	▲771.828.375	▲61%	▼16,076,051
2011	▲2,005,721,547	▲774,071,132	▲85%	▼14,165,823
