= SIP (company) =

Italian telecommunications company, 1964–1994

Società Italiana per l'Esercizio Telefonico S.p.A.

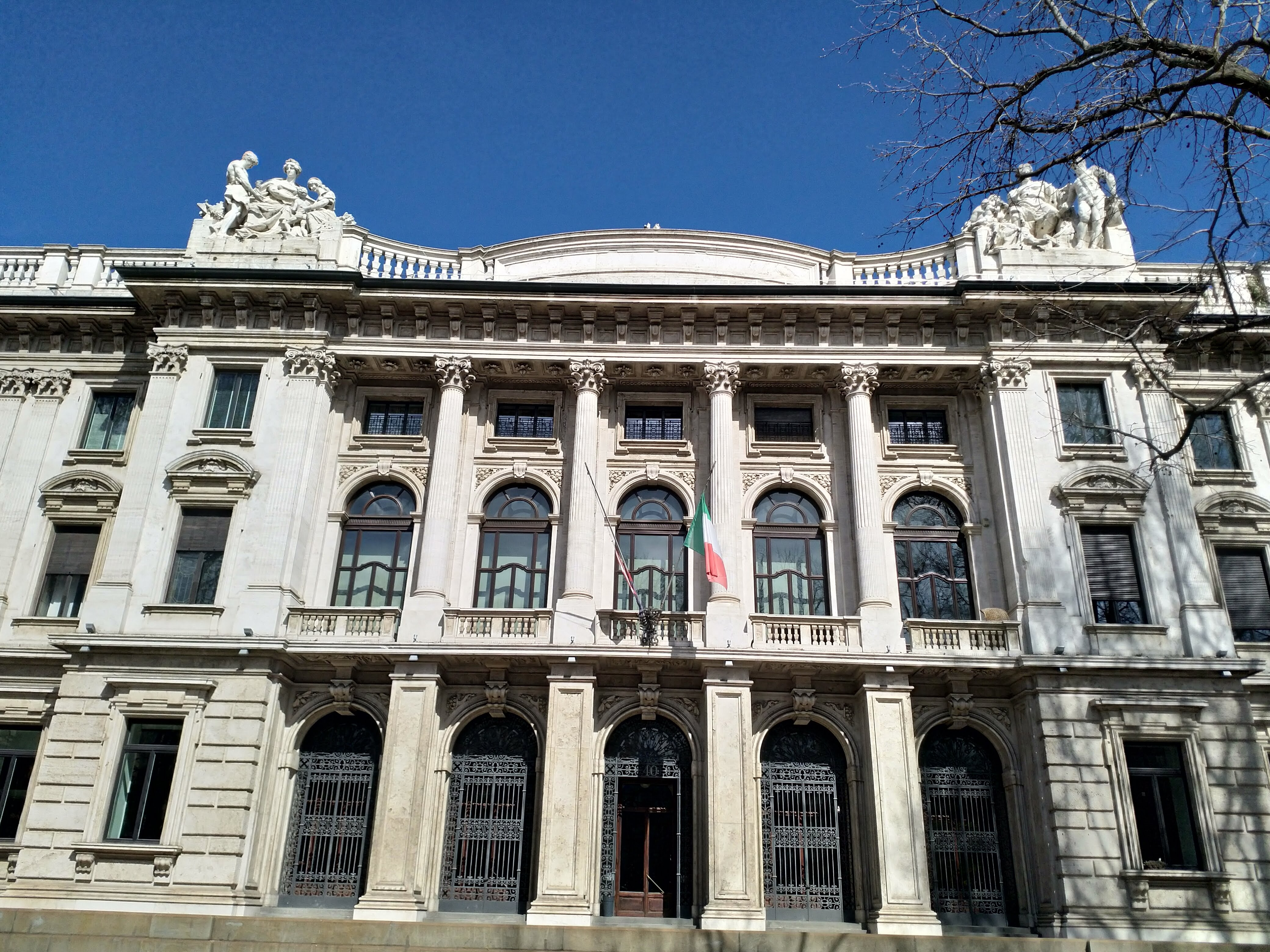
- Former SIP's headquarters in Turin, Italy
- Company type: State-owned
- Industry: Telecommunications
- Predecessor: SIP
- Founded: 1964; 61 years ago
- Founder: SIP; STIPEL; TELVE; TIMO; TETI; SET
- Defunct: 1994
- Successor: Telecom Italia
- Headquarters: Turin, Italy
- Area served: Italy
- Products: Fixed telephony; Public telephony; Mobile telephony
- Owner: IRI

Società Italiana per l'Esercizio Telefonico S.p.A. (formerly Società Idroelettrica Piemontese S.p.A.), commonly known as SIP or SIPTEL, was the Italian state-owned telecommunications company, which dealt with public, fixed and mobile telephony.

In 1994 it became Telecom Italia S.p.A.

== History ==
In 1964, the energy assets of Società Idroelettrica Piemontese (SIP), founded in 1918, was nationalized into Enel; it then acquired all of the Italian telephone companies, becoming Società Italiana per l'Esercizio Telefonico (SIP). It was run by the Italian Ministry of Finance.. SIP was a state monopoly from 1964 to 1996 and Italians were required to pay the "Canone Telecom," a line rental fee of approximately €120 per year., plus hardware rental and other minor costs) in order to have a phone at home.

On 27 July 1994, by the merger of several telecommunications companies among which SIP, IRITEL, Italcable, Telespazio and SIRM (companies owned by STET), Telecom Italia was born. This was due to a reorganization plan for the telecommunications sector presented by IRI to the Minister of Finance.

== See also ==
- Società Idroelettrica Piemontese
- STET – Società Finanziaria Telefonica
- Telecom Italia
- Telecom Italia Mobile
