= Massimo Tononi =

Italian politician (born 1964)

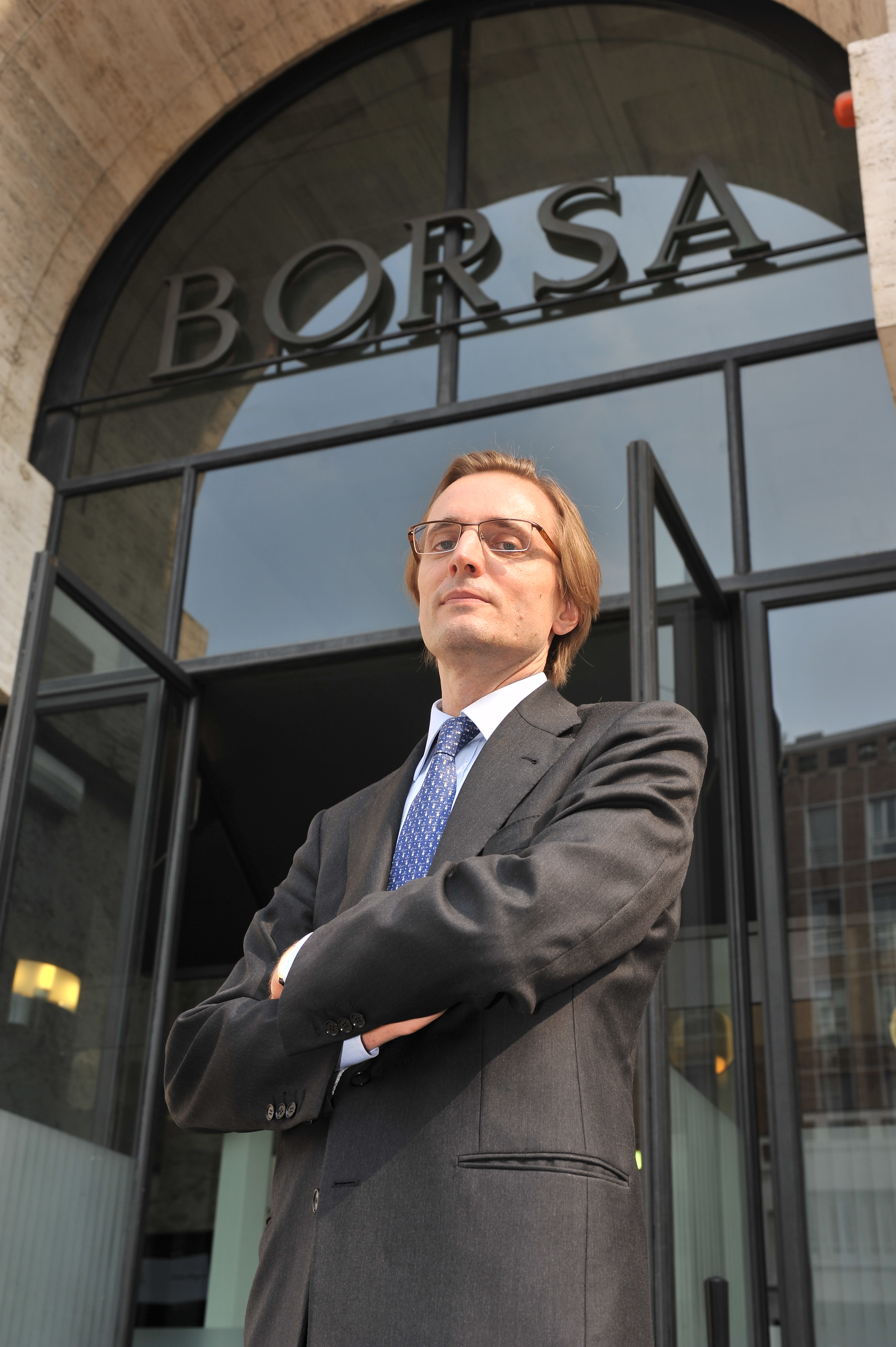

Chairman of Banco BPM
- Incumbent
- Assumed office 22 January 2020

Treasury Undersecretary of the Ministry Of Economy and Finance
- In office 16 May 2006 – 6 May 2008
- Prime Minister: Romano Prodi

Personal details
- Born: 22 August 1964 (age 62) Trento, Italy
- Education: Bocconi University

Massimo Tononi (born 22 August 1964) is an Italian banker and politician. Chairman of Banco BPM.

== Biography ==
Tononi was born on 22 August 1964 in Trento, Italy. He is the son of politician Giorgio Tononi and the brother of neuroscientist Giulio Tononi. He graduated with a degree in economics from Bocconi University in 1988. Tononi worked in the Investment Banking Division of Goldman Sachs, London from June 1988 to May 1993. He returned to Italy in 1993, where he was the Personal Assistant to the President (Romano Prodi) of the Istituto per la Ricostruzione Industriale (IRI). After Prodi left the IRI in 1994, Tononi returned to London, where he became a Partner and Managing Director of Goldman Sachs, London. From December 1999 to August 2005 he also worked at Goldman Sachs, Milan. On 18 May 2006, Tononi joined the 2nd Cabinet of Romano Prodi, where he served as Treasury Undersecretary of the Ministry Of Economy and Finance (2006-2008), then headed by Tommaso Padoa-Schioppa. Tononi had provided 100,000 € to Prodi's electoral campaign. In 2007 Tononi was implicated in a scandal regarding the Italdel-Siemens merger in the mid 1990s, In February 2007 the Treasury Police raided the Milan office of Goldman Sachs, where they removed a file called "MTononi/memo-Prodi02.doc".

Upon Prodi's sudden fall in May 2008, Tononi in September the same year again appointed a Partner and Managing Director of the Investment Banking Division of Goldman Sachs, London. In July 2010 Tononi ceased to be a Partner and Managing of Goldman Sachs, although remaining as an advisory director. He has been a Director of Mittel S.p.A. and Mittel Private Equity SpA since May 2010, a Member of the Board of Sorin SpA since June 2010, an Independent Director of Prysmian S.p.A. since July 2010, an Independent Non Executive Director of London Stock Exchange Group plc since September 2010, and a Non Executive Director of Borsa Italiana S.p.A. since 4 November 2010. On 28 June 2011, Tononi was appointed Chairman of Borsa Italiana S.p.A. On 18 April 2012, Tononi was appointed Chairman of Prysmian S.p.A.

On 7 August 2015 he resigned from board of Borsa Italiana. On 15 September he has been appointed as President of bank Monte dei Paschi di Siena by the shareholders' meeting. He resigned from the Board of Directors on 14 September 2016, just after the resignation of the CEO Fabrizio Viola, and has been substituted by Alessandro Falciai as President of the board, and by Massimo Egidi as member of the board. From November 2018 to July 2018 he was independent Member of the Board of Mediobanca. From April 2017 to October 2017 he was independent Member of the Board of Quaestio Capital Management SGR. From 24 July 2018 to 24 October 2019 he was Chairman of Cassa Depositi e Prestiti. Since 4 April 2020 he is Chairman of Banco BPM.

== See also ==
- Mario Draghi
- Gianni Letta
- Mario Monti
- Carlos Moedas
- Petros Christodoulou
