= Istituto per la Ricostruzione Industriale =

Italian public holding company (1933–2002)

Istituto per la Ricostruzione Industriale S.p.A.

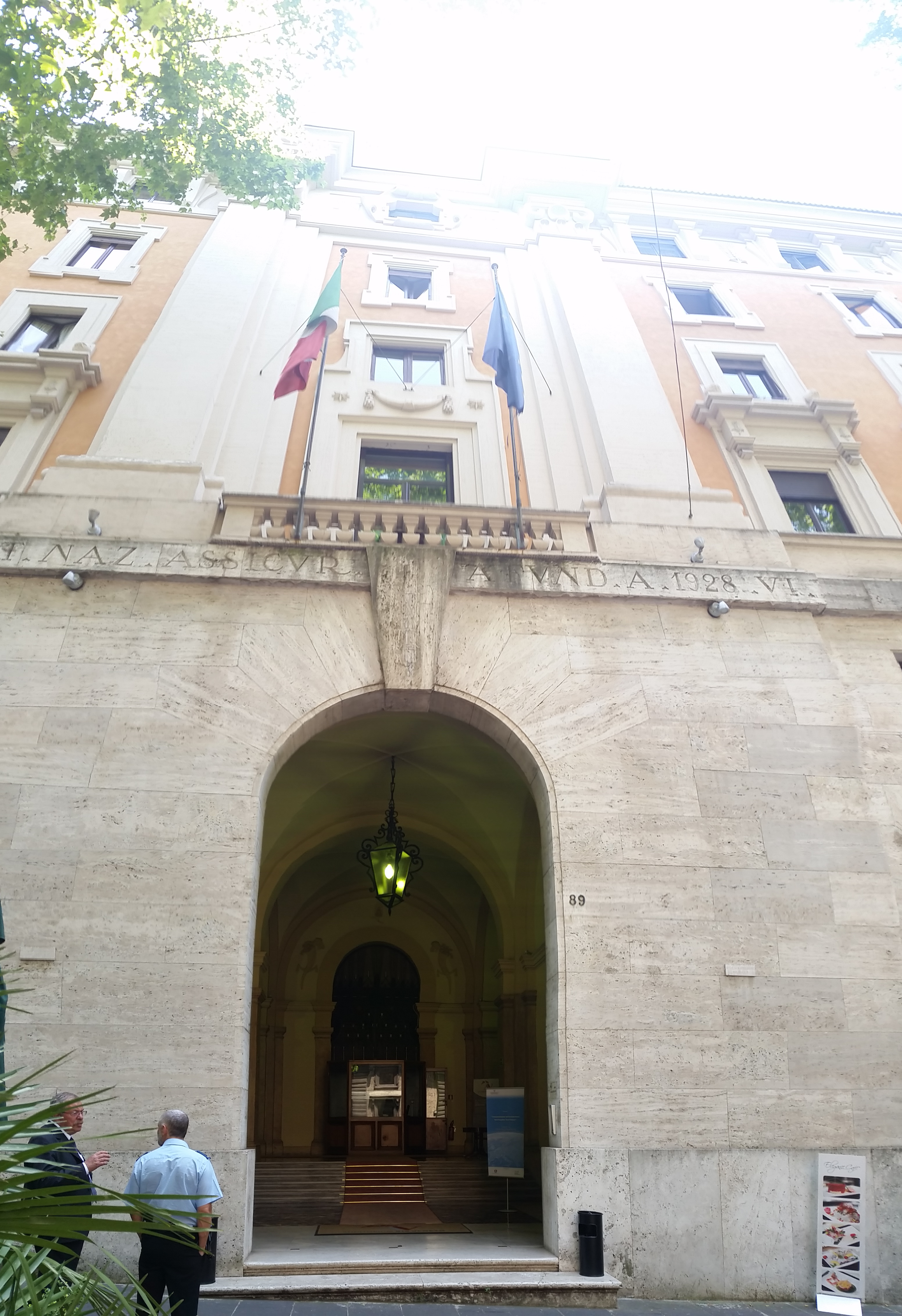
- IRI headquarters (later Fintecna headquarters) in Rome, via Vittorio Veneto, 89.
- Type: State-owned
- Industry: Food; Aerospace; Automotive; Shipbuilding; Chemical; Publishing; Financial; Computer; Microelectronics; Metallurgical; Telecommuniccations; Transport
- Founded: 24 January 1933; 93 years ago
- Founder: Mussolini Cabinet; Alberto Beneduce; Guido Jung
- Defunct: 27 June 2000; 26 years ago
- Fate: Liquidated; in 2002 it was incorporated into Fintecna
- Successor: Fintecna
- Headquarters: via Vittorio Veneto, 89, Rome, Italy
- Area served: Italy
- Owner: Ministry of State Participations
- Subsidiaries: List: Alfa Romeo; Alitalia; Atlantia; Autostrade; Banca Commerciale Italiana; Banco di Roma; Cofiri; Credito Italiano; Fincantieri; Finelettrica; Finmare; Finmeccanica; Finsider; Italstat; Rai; SIP; SME; STET
- Website: www.archiviostoricoiri.it

The Istituto per la Ricostruzione Industriale (IRI; English: "Institute for Industrial Reconstruction") was an Italian public holding company established in 1933 by the Fascist regime to rescue, restructure and finance banks and private companies that went bankrupt during the Great Depression. After the Second World War, IRI played a pivotal role in the Italian economic miracle of the 1950s and 1960s. It was dissolved in 2002.

== History ==
In 1930, the Great Depression affected the Italian financial sector, seriously disrupting credit lines and making it difficult for companies to obtain loans. The Fascist regime led by Benito Mussolini, fearing a credit crunch with subsequent mass dismissals and a wave of social unrest, started to take over the banks' stakes in large industrial companies (such as steel, weapons and chemicals).

At the same time, Mussolini tried to inject capital into failing businesses (though these were later restructured). Although initially conceived as a temporary measure, IRI continued to operate throughout the period of the Fascist regime and well beyond. Although IRI was not intended to carry out real nationalizations, it became the de facto owner and operator of a large number of major banks and companies. By January 1934, the IRI had an incidence of nominal ownership of 21.49%, and a few months later acquired the capital of the banks themselves, prompting Mussolini to declare on 26 May 1934 to Italy's Chamber of Deputies that “Three-fourths of the Italian economy, industrial and agricultural, is in the hands of the State.”

Signor Pirelli,, an outstanding businessman and a power in the corporative system, explained: 'Beyond the frontiers there has been a misunderstanding of the meaning of one of Mussolini's phrases to the effect that three-quarters of the Italian economic system, both industrial and agricultural, is under State supervision.

Almost all the medium-sized and little firms and the great majority of slightly larger firms, with the exception of a few categories, are completely outside the sphere of the State's healing activity.' 1S Business policies came to be increasingly shaped by the Government, but security against the risks of business was provided only to the biggest capitalists. By 1936, its weight on the total capital of the Italian joint stock companies was 12.5%.

The IRI heavily succeeded in its goals as it saved failing banks and companies by restructuring and refinancing the companies and banks. By 1939, the IRI and other government agencies “controlled over four-fifths of Italy’s shipping and shipbuilding, three-quarters of its pig iron production and almost half that of steel.”

The political historian Martin Blinkhorn noted that “This level of state intervention greatly surpassed that in Nazi Germany, giving Italy a public sector second only to that of Stalin’s Russia.” In reality, the IRI's activity was actually limited on the one hand to providing assistance mostly financing, and the other it was reduced exclusively to accounting and administrative control, without much interference in drawing up technical and economic plans on a large scale.

== After the war ==
After the war, the survival of the institute was uncertain, as it had been created more as a temporary solution than to meet long-term goals. But it proved difficult for private companies to make the necessary large investments that would only yield returns in the long term. So IRI retained the structure it had under fascism.

Only after 1950 was IRI's function better defined. A new trust was created by Oscar Sinigaglia, who, planning to increase the production capacity of the Italian steel industry, formed an alliance with private industry. This gave IRI the new role of developing the industrial infrastructure of the country, not by means of individual investments, but by an unwritten division of labour. Examples were the development of the steel industry, the telephone network and the construction of the Autostrada del Sole, which began in 1956.

== "The IRI formula" ==
The Italian economy grew rapidly in the 1960s, and the IRI was one of the protagonists of the "Italian economic miracle". Other European countries, particularly the British Labour government, saw the "IRI formula" as a positive example of state intervention in the economy, better than the simple "nationalization" because it allowed for cooperation between public and private capital. Many in the IRI group remained publicly traded, and corporate bonds issued by the institute to fund their companies were heavily subscribed.

At the head of IRI were leading members of the Christian Democracy party, such as Giuseppe Petrilli, president of the institute from 1960 to 1979. In his writings, Petrilli developed a theory that emphasized the positive effects of the "IRI formula". Across the IRI, companies were used for social purposes, and the state had to bear the costs and inefficiencies generated by their investments. IRI did not always follow standard commercial practices. Instead, it invested in the community's interests, even when uneconomic and sometimes to the point of generating “improper charges”.

Critical of these welfare-oriented practices was the second President of the Italian Republic, the Liberal Luigi Einaudi, who said: "A public company, if not based on economic criteria, tends to a hospice-type of charity." Since the objectives of the state were to develop the southern economy and to maintain full employment, the IRI had to concentrate its investments in the south and to develop jobs in its companies. Petrilli's position reflected views already widespread within Christian Democracy, which sought a third way between liberalism and communism and dated back to the 1943 Codice di Camaldoli. IRI's mixed system of state owned enterprises seemed to realize this hybrid between the two models.

== Investments and rescues ==
IRI invested very large amounts in southern Italy, such as in the construction of Italsider in Taranto, Alfasud Pomigliano d'Arco and Pratola Serra in Irpinia. Others were planned but never carried out, such as the steelworks of Gioia Tauro. To avoid serious employment crises, the IRI was often called in to help private companies in trouble: examples are the bailouts of Motta and Shipbuilding Rinaldo Piaggio and the acquisition of food companies by Montedison. This gave rise to more activities and dependents for the institute.

== Governance ==
For most of its history, the IRI was an ente pubblico economico, which reported formally to the Ministry of State Holdings. At its head were a board of directors and an advisory board, consisting of a chairman and members appointed by the ruling political parties. The president of IRI was always appointed by the Christian Democrats, the vice-presidency was often provided by the Republican Party, for example Bruno Visentini for more than twenty years and then Pietro Armani, to counterbalance the weight of the Catholics with those of big business and the laity, represented by the Republicans. The appointment of the heads of banking, financial and other major companies was decided by the presidential committee, but especially during the tenure of Petrilli, the powers were concentrated in the hands of the president and a few people close to him.

After the transformation of IRI into a limited company in 1992, the board was reduced to only three members, and the influence of the Christian Democrat and other parties, in a period when many of their members were involved in the Tangentopoli investigation, was greatly reduced. After the privatization of the group's companies, IRI's management was centralized in the hands of the Treasury

The IRI name remained in journalistic language as a byword for those who assign public investments to companies without strong business criteria. Government agencies such as the Cassa Depositi e Prestiti (a bank) and Sviluppo Italia have been dubbed "new IRI", with some negative connotations, to indicate that their purposes and policies tend to patronage, according to critics, rather than economic criteria.

In 1980, IRI was a group of about 1,000 companies with more than 500,000 employees. For many years, it was the largest industrial company outside the United States. In 1992, it ended the year with revenues of 75,912 trillion lire, but with losses of 5,182 billion. In 1993, it was the world's seventh-largest company by revenue, with 67.5 billion dollars in sales.

== Privatization ==
After World War II, IRI became one of the largest state conglomerates in the world, owning many diverse businesses such as the autostrada system, the flag carrier Alitalia and many banks, steel, food, chemicals and telecom companies. It was divested and privatized during the 1980s and 1990s and eventually dissolved in 2002. The Andreatta-Van Miert agreement marked a significant acceleration of privatization, which started in 1992.

Despite some opinions to the contrary, the Treasury chose not to privatize the IRI, but to sell off its operating companies. This policy was inaugurated under the first government of Giuliano Amato and was never called into question by later governments. In 1997, it reached the levels of indebtedness secured by the Andreatta-Van Miert agreement, but divestitures continued, and the institute had lost any function but to sell its assets.

== See also ==
- Alitalia (Flag carrier)
- Autostrade per l'Italia (highways)
- Banca Commerciale Italiana (Bank of National Interest)
- Banco di Roma (Bank of National Interest)
- Credito Italiano (Bank of National Interest)
- Economy of Italy under fascism
- Fincantieri (naval construction)
- Finmeccanica (mechanics and automobiles)
- Instituto Nacional de Industria – Spanish state-owned financing and industrial holding company
- National Enterprise Board - British state-owned financing and industrial holding body, modelled on the IRI
- RAI (Public broadcaster)
- SIP (telephone company; became Telecom Italia in 1994)
- STET (telephone company owned by IRI and founded by it in 1933; merged with Telecom Italia in 1997)

== Sources ==
- Vera Lutz, Italy: A Study in Economic Development, Oxford, Oxford University Press, 1962.
- Pasquale Saraceno, Il sistema delle imprese a partecipazione statale nell'esperienza italiana, Milano, Giuffrè, 1975.
- Bruno Amoroso – O.J. Olsen, Lo stato imprenditore, Bari, Laterza, 1978.
- Nico Perrone, Il dissesto programmato. Le partecipazioni statali nel sistema di consenso democristiano, Bari, Dedalo, 1992, ISBN 88-220-6115-2
- Stuart Holland (ed.) The State as Entrepreneur, New dimensions for public enterprise: the IRI state shareholding formula. 1972, The Centre for Contemporary European Studies, University of Sussex.
