= Costamagna =

Costamagna is an Italian surname. Notable people with the surname include:

- Alejandra Costamagna (born 1970), Chilean writer and journalist
- Carlo Costamagna (1881–1965), Italian lawyer and academic
- Claudio Costamagna (born 1956), Italian banker
- Luisella Costamagna (born 1968), Italian journalist and TV presenter
