= Botswana National Development Bank Staff Union =

Trade union in Botswana

BNDBU
- Botswana National Development Bank Staff Union
- Headquarters: Gaborone, Botswana
- Location: Botswana
- Key people: Nelly Molefe, general secretary
- Affiliations: BFTU

The Botswana National Development Bank Staff Union (BNDBU) is a trade union representing employees at the National Development Bank of Botswana. It is an affiliate of the Botswana Federation of Trade Unions in Botswana.
