= Fabio Gallia =

Italian banker (1963–2024)

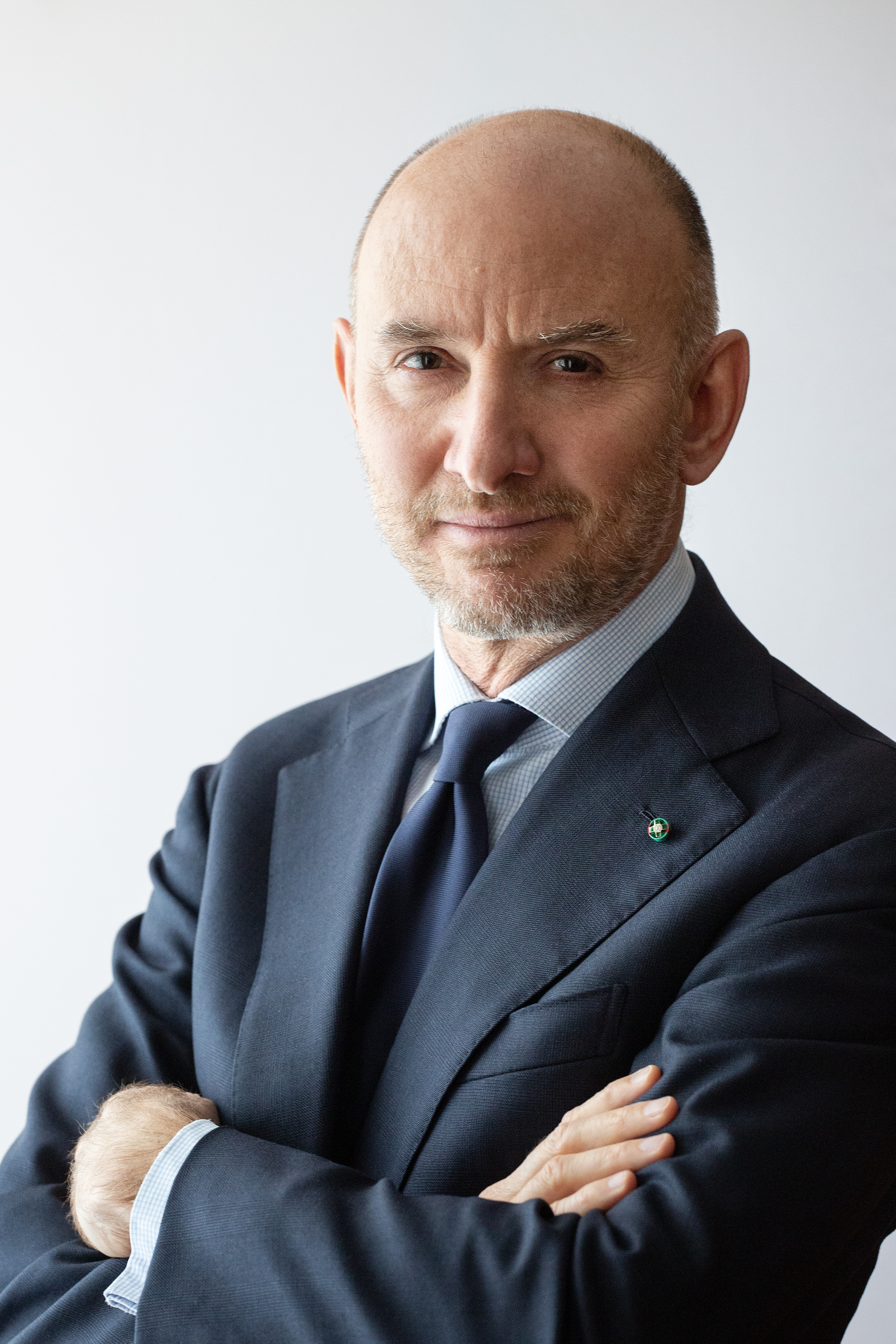
- Gallia in 2010
- Born: 20 August 1963; Alessandria, Italy
- Died: 7 May 2024 (aged 60)
- Education: University of Turin
- Occupations: Chartered account, banker
- Employers: Capitalia (2002–2007); BNP Paribas (2008–2015); Cassa Depositi e Prestiti (2015–2018); Fincantieri (2020–2022); Simple Equity Partners (2018–); Brookfield Asset Management (2018–2023); Centerview Partners (2023–2024)
- Title: Chief executive officer &; general manager
- Board member of: BNL (2008–2015); Finsoe (2008–2012); Findomestic Banca (2009–2015); Cassa Depositi e Prestiti (2015–2018); Italian Strategic Fund (2015–2018)

Fabio Gallia (20 August 1963 – 7 May 2024) was an Italian banker, manager and businessman.

Until his death, he held the position of senior advisor at Centerview Partners, a global investment bank based in New York. Centerview Partners was rated as the "No. 1 Investment Bank to Work For" by Vault and ranked among the best investment banking boutiques in the world.

During his over 30-year career, Fabio operated at the highest levels of the banking and investment industry where he led as CEO several financial institutions and acted as a trusted advisor to entrepreneurs, private equity and infrastructure investors.

From 2020 until 2022 Fabio Gallia held the position of general manager of Fincantieri, the world's leading shipbuilding company, with €7 billion in revenue, 21 thousand employees; active in the cruising, naval and off-shore sectors, with a global manufacturing footprint.

Prior to that, Fabio was a CEO of Cassa Depositi e Prestiti (CDP), the Italian Sovereign Wealth Fund whose activities encompass lending to public authorities and corporates, infrastructure projects; equity investments (strategic long-term equity, private equity and venture capital) and real estate. CDP, with assets in excess of US$400 billion, was and still is the largest investor in the Italian Stock Exchange with stakes in companies like Eni, Fincantieri, Poste Italiane, Snam, Terna, Italgas, Saipem.

He was previously CEO of BNL-BNP Paribas Group and member of the group executive committee. With revenue of €5 billion, total assets in excess of €110 billion and 20 thousand employees, the Group Italian activities include: commercial and investment banking, asset management and insurance, consumer finance and real estate.

Before that, he joined Capitalia Group, then Italy's third largest banking Group, as Co-General Manager and CFO and later as CEO of Fineco and Banca di Roma.

Prior to joining Capitalia, after a stint at Accenture, he worked for Ersel AM, the then-leading Italian independent asset management firm.

He was an independent board member of Edison (Italian leader in the energy market, €9 billion sales, listed on the Milan Stock Exchange and part of EDF Group). He also served as a member of the board of Telethon Foundation (world-leading research institution focusing on rare genetic diseases) and as a member of the Audit Committee of the European Society of Cardiology.

He was senior advisor of Brookfield Asset Management and member of the European Business Heads board until 2023. He was an independent board member of several industrial companies and institutions within the financial industry, including Borsa Italiana (the Italian Stock Exchange).

== Career before Capitalia ==
Gallia began his career in 1988 at consultancy firm Accenture.

In 1990 he was employed by Ersel Asset Management Sgr, the then Italian leading independent asset management firm (Giubergia Group), where he covered roles of increasing responsibility, before becoming general manager and partner in 1999.

== Career at Capitalia Group ==
In 2002, he joined Capitalia Group, then Italy's third largest banking group, as co-general manager and chief financial officer in charge of the group's finance, wealth management and distribution. In 2003, he was appointed chief executive officer of Fineco (listed sub-holding of the Capitalia Group): in 2005, Fineco was incorporated into Capitalia. From 2005 to 2007, he was chief executive officer of Banca di Roma and chairman of the management committee of the Capitalia Group.

== Career at BNP Paribas Group ==
From 2008 he was chief executive officer and general manager of BNL - BNP Paribas Group and member of the executive committee of BNP Paribas. From 2009, he was chairman of Findomestic Banca and, from 2012, he managed the BNP Paribas Group in Italy.

== Career at Cassa Depositi e Prestiti ==
From July 2015 to July 2018, he held the position of chief executive officer and general manager of Cassa Depositi e Prestiti.

== Other professional experience ==
He was board member of Edison (EDF Group) and Telethon Foundation (leading research institution focusing on rare genetic diseases); he later served as a member of the Audit Committee of the European Society of Cardiology.

He held previous board positions in Borsa Italiana (Italian Stock Exchange), MTS (electronic trading platform), Ariston Thermo (Merloni Group, heating systems), Coesia (Seragnoli Group, packaging machinery), Manifatture Sigaro Toscano, Mooney (formerly SisalPay), Museo Egizio di Torino Foundation and both in insurance and asset management businesses.

== Education ==
Gallia graduated in 1987 with a degree in Business and Economics from the University of Turin. From 1989, he was on the register of the Italian chartered accountants. He was married, had two sons and lived in Rome.

== Honours ==
In June 2013 Fabio Gallia was named “Chevalier” of the National Order of Legion of Honour of the French Republic.

In May 2015 Fabio Gallia was appointed Knight of Labour of the Italian Republic.

In February 2019, he received a PhD honoris causa in Management, Banking and Commodity Sciences from La Sapienza University in Rome.

== Death ==
Gallia died on 7 May 2024, at the age of 60.
