= List of national development banks =

List of public banks

A national development bank is a development bank created by a country's government that provides financing for the purposes of economic development of the country.

== Africa ==
- Botswana: National Development Bank of Botswana (NDB Botswana)
- Ethiopia: Development Bank of Ethiopia (DBE)
- Ghana: Agricultural Development Bank of Ghana (ADB)
- Kenya: Development Bank of Kenya (DBK)
- Mozambique: Banco Nacional de Investimento (BNI)
- Nigeria: Bank of Industry (BOI)
- Rwanda: Rwanda Development Bank (BRD)
- Tanzania: Tanzania Agricultural Development Bank (TADB)
- Uganda: Uganda Development Bank Limited (UDBL)

== Americas ==
- Brazil: Brazilian Development Bank (BNDES)
- Canada: Business Development Bank of Canada (BDC)
- Colombia: Financiera de Desarrollo Territorial (FINDETER)
- El Salvador: Banco de Desarrollo de El Salvador (BANDESAL)
- Jamaica: Development Bank of Jamaica
- Peru: Corporación Financiera de Desarrollo (Cofide)
- United States: Reconstruction Finance Corporation (1931-1957) and Puerto Rico Government Development Bank

== Asia and Oceania ==
- Bahrain: Bahrain Development Bank (BDB)
- Bangladesh: Bangladesh Development Bank
- China: China Development Bank (CDB) and Agricultural Development Bank of China (ADBC)
- Fiji: Fiji Development Bank (FDB)
- India: Industrial Development Bank of India (IDBI), Industrial Finance Corporation of India (IFCI), Small Industries Development Bank of India (SIDBI), National Bank for Agriculture and Rural Development (NABARD), Exim Bank of India (EXIM), National Housing Bank (NHB), National Bank for Financing Infrastructure and Development (NaBFID)
- Japan: Development Bank of Japan (DBJ)
- Kazakhstan: Development Bank of Kazakhstan (BRKZ)
- Malaysia: Development Bank of Sarawak (DBOS)
- South Korea: Korea Development Bank (KDB)
- Kuwait: Industrial Bank of Kuwait (IDK)
- Pakistan: Industrial Development Bank of Pakistan (IDBP)
- Papua New Guinea: National Development Bank of Papua New Guinea (NDB)
- Philippines: Development Bank of the Philippines (DBP)
- Qatar: Qatar Development Bank (QDB)
- Sri Lanka: National Development Bank (NDB)
- Maldives: Development Bank of Maldives (DBM)
- National Development Bank of Palau.

== Europe ==
- Albania: Albanian Development Bank
- Austria: Austrian Development Bank [de] (OeEB)
- Bulgaria: Bulgarian Development Bank (BDB)
- Croatia: Croatian Bank for Reconstruction and Development (HBOR)
- Czech Republic: National Development Bank of the Czech Republic (NRB)
- France: Caisse des Dépôts et Consignations (CDC) and Bpifrance
- Germany: KfW
- Greece: Hellenic Development Bank (HDB)
- Hungary: Hungarian Development Bank (MFB)
- Ireland: Strategic Banking Corporation of Ireland (SBCI)
- Italy: Cassa Depositi e Prestiti (CDP)
- Lithuania: National Development Bank ILTE
- Luxembourg: Société Nationale de Crédit et d'Investissement (SNCI)
- Norway: Innovation Norway
- Poland: National Development Bank (BGK)
- Russia: Vnesheconombank (VEB.RF)
- Scotland: Scottish National Investment Bank
- Slovakia: Slovenská záručná a rozvojová banka
- Spain: Instituto de Crédito Oficial (ICO)
- Turkey: Development Bank of Turkey (Kalkınma) and Industrial Development Bank of Turkey (TSKB)
- United Kingdom: British Business Bank (BBB)
- Wales: Development Bank of Wales

== See also ==
- Multilateral development bank
- List of development aid agencies
