= National Development Bank of Botswana =

Development bank in Botswana

Coordinates: 24°39′25″S 25°55′07″E

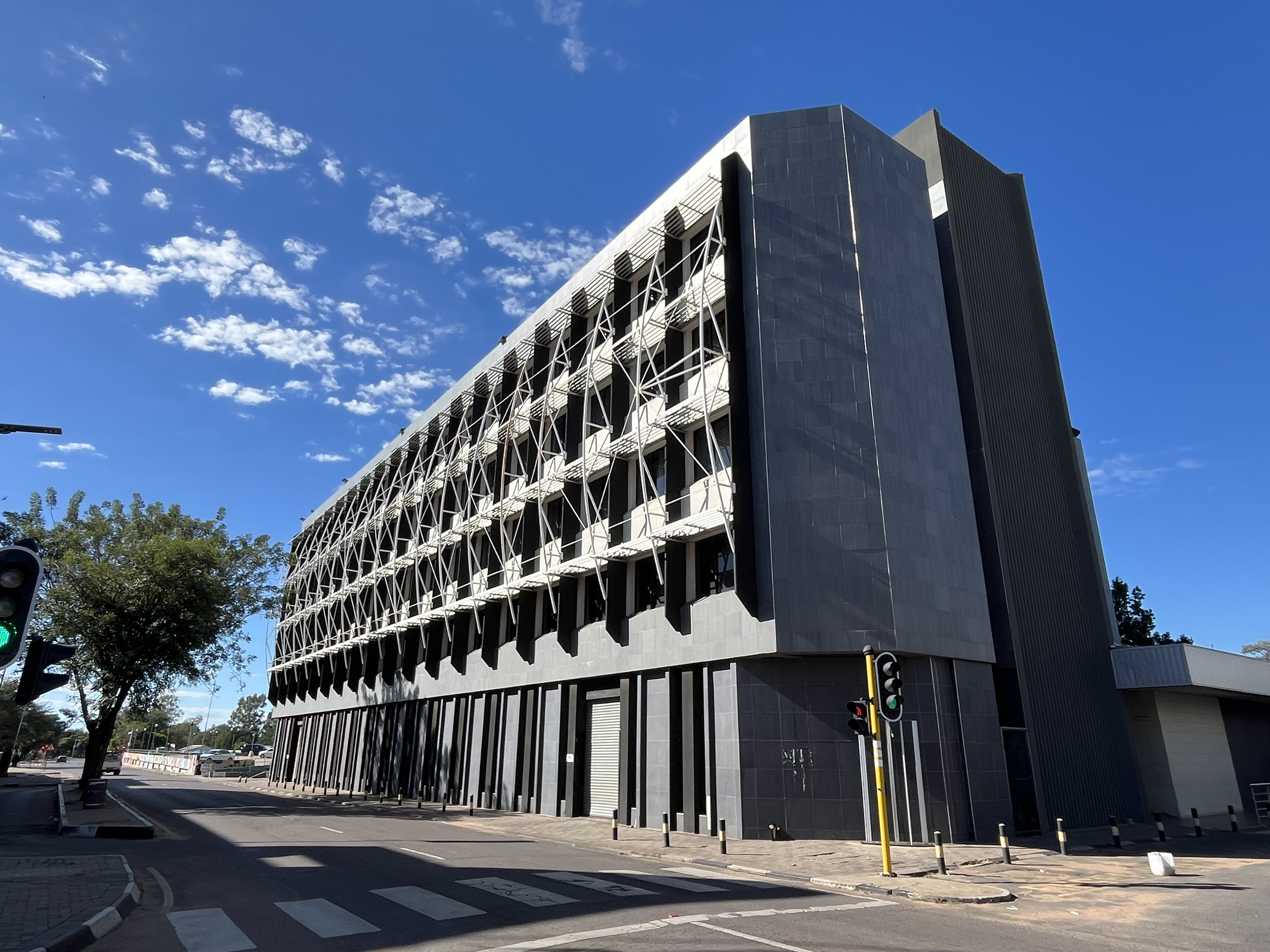
- Type: Parastatal
- Industry: Finance
- Founded: 1963; 63 years ago
- Headquarters: 161 Queens Road, Central Business District, Gaborone, Botswana
- Key people: Wilfred Mpai; Chairman; Lorato Morapedi; Chief Executive Officer
- Products: Agricultural Projects, Property, Education, Retail, Commerce & Industry
- Revenue: ▼Aftertax:BPW:168,150,000 (US$14.9 million) (2017)
- Total assets: BPW:1,444,758,000 (US$138 million) (2017)
- Owner: Government of Botswana
- Website: www.ndb.bw

The National Development Bank of Botswana, (NDB Botswana), is a government-owned development bank in Botswana.

== Location ==
The headquarters and main branch of NDB Botswana are located at 161 Queens Road, in the central business district of Gaborone, Botswana's capital city. The bank maintains branch offices in Francistown, Maun and Palapye. The geographical coordinates of the bank's headquarters are 24°39'25.0"S, 25°55'07.0"E (Latitude:-24.656944; Longitude:25.918611).

== Overview ==
NDB Botswana is a national development financial institution. While all development economic activity funding is considered, as of 2020, the focus is on funding agricultural development and the establishment of food security in Botswana. As of 31 March 2017, the bank's total assets were BPW:1,444,758,000 (US$138 million), with shareholders' equity of BPW:587,444,000 (US$52 million).

== History ==
National Development Bank of Botswana was established in 1963 by act of parliament. Its main objective is to provide financial services to Botswana's business sector. Its second objective is to earn satisfactory returns on shareholders' funds.

== Ownership ==
The bank is 100 percent owned by the government of Botswana.

== Board of directors ==
As of July 2020 the following constitute the nine-person Board of Directors of the bank: 1. Wilfred Mpai: Chairman 2. Patricia M. Makepe: Deputy Chairperson 3. Mendel Ngoni Nlanda: Non-Executive Director 4. Olefile K. Mokatse: Non-Executive Director 5. Mmadima Nyathi: Non-Executive Director 6. Gerald N. Nthebolan: Non-Executive Director 7. Onthusitse M. Mosiakgabo: Non-Executive Director 8. Oganeditse Marata: Non-Executive Director and 9. Colleen M. Motswaiso: Non-Executive Director.

== Senior management ==
The Chief Executive Officer, supervises nine other senior managers. As of July 2020, the CEO is Ms Lorato Morapedi.

== See also ==
- Botswana National Development Bank Staff Union
- African Development Bank
- Uganda Development Bank Limited
- Development Bank of Kenya
- Botswana Unified Revenue Service
- List of national development banks
