= Fintecna =

Italian state-owned liquidation and real estate services company

Fintecna S.p.A.
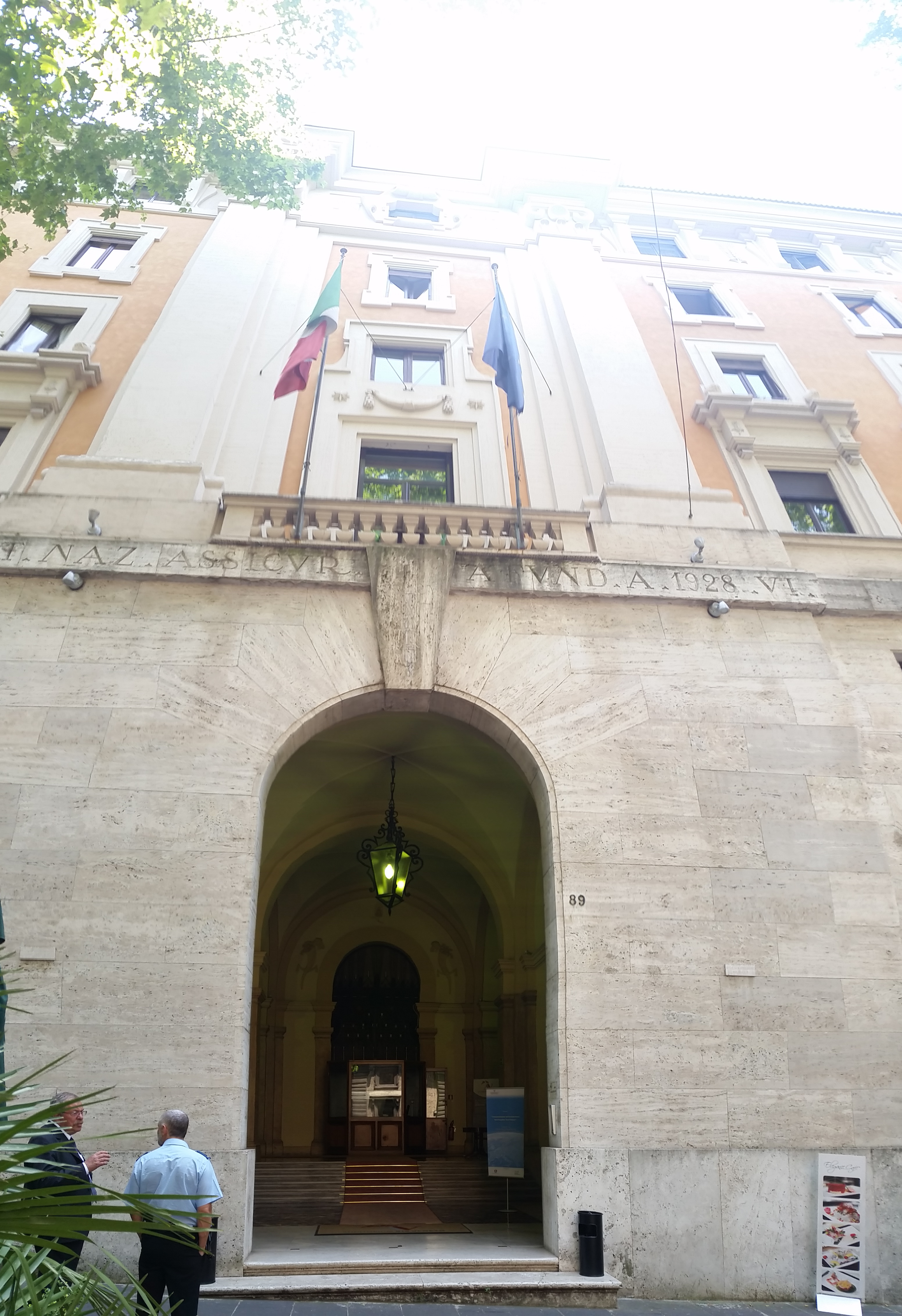
- Former IRI headquarters in Via Vittorio Veneto, Rome
- Type: Società per azioni (state-owned)
- Industry: Liquidation services, real estate services, support to public administration
- Founded: July 1993
- Headquarters: Rome, Italy
- Key people: Moroello Diaz della Vittoria Pallavicini (Chairman), Mario Valducci (CEO)
- Services: Liquidation procedures, real estate services, support to public administration
- Revenue: 41,567,000 euro (2014)
- Net income: €11.1 million (2025)
- Owner: Cassa Depositi e Prestiti (100%)
- Number of employees: 161 (2025)
- Parent: Cassa Depositi e Prestiti
- Website: www.cdp.it/pages/en/fintecna/

Fintecna S.p.A. is an Italian state-controlled company, wholly owned by Cassa Depositi e Prestiti (CDP), that manages liquidation procedures of companies, including public ones, provides real estate services within the CDP Group, and supports the public administration. It is headquartered in Rome and is subject to CDP's direction and coordination.

== History ==
Fintecna was established in 1993 to restructure the viable activities of Iritecna and to manage the run-off of its liquidation. In its early years it managed the restructuring, liquidation and privatisation of state-owned companies.

In 2002 it absorbed the Istituto per la Ricostruzione Industriale (IRI), then in liquidation, and took over its remaining holdings. Between 2007 and 2010 the separate estates of the former EFIM, IGED and SIR were transferred to Fintecna for liquidation.

In 2012 CDP acquired Fintecna from the Ministry of Economy and Finance, refocusing the company on liquidation activities. A 2021 law (Law 147/2021) enabled Fintecna to act as liquidator of public shareholdings in the context of periodic rationalisation and, when appointed by decree of the Ministry of Enterprises and Made in Italy, as extraordinary commissioner in extraordinary administration procedures. In 2023, within the reorganisation of the CDP Group's real estate area, Fintecna became the group's competence centre for real estate services and property sales, while CDP Real Asset SGR took over asset and fund management.

In March 2025 the board approved a 2025–2027 Strategic Plan aimed at strengthening Fintecna's advisory activities for the public administration.

== Activities ==
=== Liquidation processes ===
Fintecna manages the liquidation of the residual assets of the former IRI group, directs the liquidation of the separate estates of the former EFIM, IGED and EXPO, and acts as liquidator of entities such as the Ente Nazionale per la Cellulosa e per la Carta, the Consorzio del Canale Milano-Cremona-Po and Consorzio Bancario SIR. It also liquidates CDP Group companies, including IQ Made in Italy Investment Company and CDP Immobiliare and its subsidiaries. The extraordinary administration procedures of Alitalia Servizi and Tirrenia di Navigazione are run by the competent commissioners; as of the end of 2024 no distribution had been made to Fintecna, which had fully written down the related assets.

=== Real estate services ===
Fintecna provides project and construction management, property management and property disposal services for owned and non-owned portfolios within the CDP Group. Among its main reference assets are Le Torri dell'Eur and the former Poligrafico building in Rome, the latter intended to house the single headquarters of the CDP Group companies in 2026.

=== Support to the public administration ===
Fintecna has supported commissioner structures after natural disasters: the 2009 earthquake in Abruzzo, the 2012 earthquake in Emilia-Romagna (under a 2013 agreement that ended in 2021, with residual activities completed in 2022) and the 2016 earthquakes in Lazio, Umbria, Marche and Abruzzo, for which its agreement with the extraordinary commissioner was most recently renewed until 31 December 2025, with funding of €7.5 million authorised by the 2026 budget law for its renewal in 2026. It also developed the "GE.DI.SI." digital platform for post-2016 reconstruction, opened to the public on 17 January 2023, and provides technical support to the Civil Protection Department for flood and hydrogeological risk measures under the National Recovery and Resilience Plan. In addition, it supports public bodies in rationalising their non-instrumental shareholdings.

In January 2025, decrees of the Minister of Enterprises and Made in Italy appointed Fintecna extraordinary commissioner in twelve extraordinary administration procedures involving 62 companies; following rulings of the Lazio Regional Administrative Court annulling three of the appointments, Fintecna manages nine procedures covering 34 companies.

== Governance ==
The board of directors for 2025–2027 consists of Moroello Diaz della Vittoria Pallavicini (chairman), Mario Valducci (chief executive officer) and directors Angela Lasco, Maria Limardo, Laura Oliva and Alessandro Vespa.

== See also ==
- Cassa Depositi e Prestiti
- Istituto per la Ricostruzione Industriale
