= Hungarian Development Bank =

Credit institution in Hungary

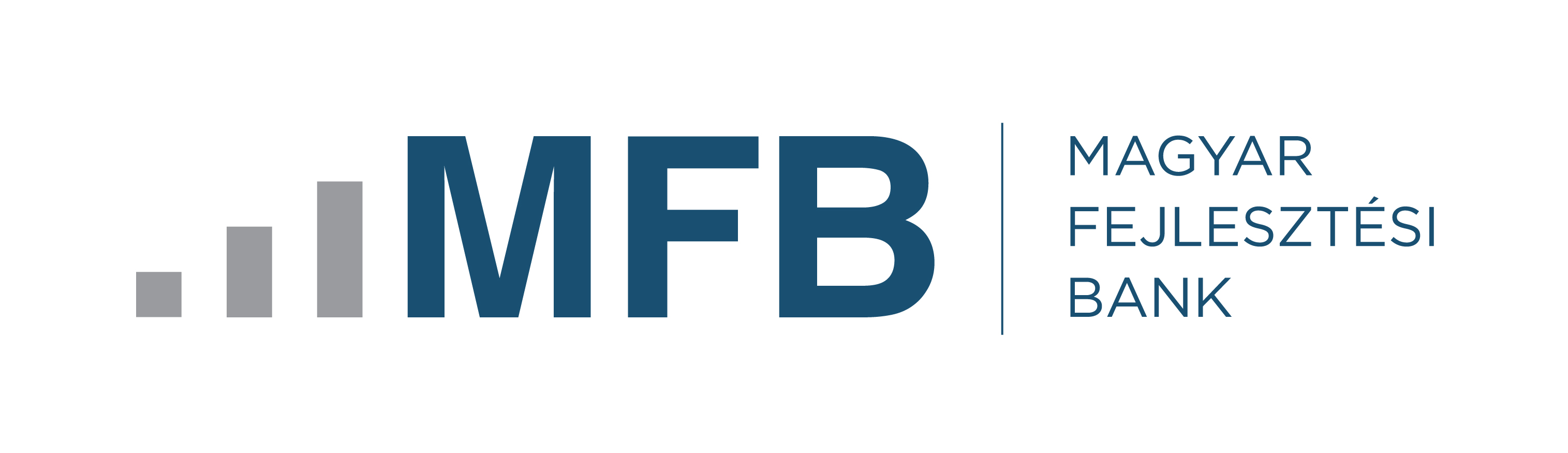
- Type: Private limited company
- Founded: 1991
- Headquarters: Budapest, Hungary
- Key people: János Gerendás Chairman and CEO
- Services: Corporate development loans
- Total assets: HUF 3605.24 billion (2023)
- Owner: Government of Hungary

Hungarian Development Bank Private Limited Company or Hungarian Development Bank, in short (Magyar Fejlesztési Bank Zártkörűen Működő Részvénytársaság, Magyar Fejlesztési Bank, in short) (MFB Zrt.), is a credit institution fully owned by the government of Hungary.

Hungarian Development Bank (HDB)'s legal status, tasks, and scope of activities are defined in Act XX of 2001 (the MFB Act), its Memorandum of Association, and the strategy approved by the Hungarian Parliament and Government. Its core tasks include the provision of funding for growth under favorable terms and conditions to Hungarian enterprises, supporting the long-term development objectives of the state, and obtaining funds from money markets for these purposes. MFB also provides retail financial products, primarily for energy-related purposes, and plays a key role in facilitating access to European Union funds.

MFB has been receiving individual international credit ratings from Moody's Investors Service since 19 May 2003.

In 2023, the financial institution's total balance sheet exceeded HUF 3,500 billion, with the loan portfolio nearing HUF 1,500 billion.

== History ==
The legal predecessor of HDB was the Hungarian Investment and Development Co. (Magyar Befektetési és Fejlesztési Rt.) which was formed on 27 November 1991. MBFB was established by three state-owned institutions, Hungarian Asset Management Co. (Állami Vagyonkezelő Rt.), Hungarian Asset Management Agency (Állami Vagyonügynökség) and Hungarian Development Institute Co. (Állami Fejlesztési Intézet Rt.)

MBFB was not a bank at the time of its establishment. On 1 July 1993, it was transformed into an investment bank, from which time it was called Hungarian Investment and Development Bank Co. (Magyar Befektetési és Fejlesztési Bank Rt.). MBFB was involved in the provision of Japanese, German and EU loans in Hungary from 1995, and also acquired interest in regional development companies and subsequently in Rákóczi Bank. In the same year, MBFB took over the Pénzintézeti Központ from the Ministry of Finance and became a shareholder in Investbank.

In 1997, the bank became the MFB Zrt. It played an active role in the consolidation and improvement of Hungarian financial institutions in the second half of the 1990s. Between 1996 and 1998, MFB Zrt. grew into a complex banking group having among its members a broker company, specialized banks in addition to being regional development companies.

In 2000, strategic activities serving economic policy priorities were separated from the MFB Zrt. activities performed at its own business risk. That same year, six SME funding programs were launched and a funding product targeting family farms was introduced.

Another turning point was Act XX of 2001 on the Hungarian Development Bank, which has been the legislative framework for the operation of the Bank ever since. The strategy developed in 2002 and adopted by the Government in 2003 made a difference by positioning the bank as a classic development bank. This strategy set the main directions of operation until 2008, which were subsequently adjusted in the light of the changes in international and domestic conditions in 2007, outlining a set of objectives and a toolkit for the period until 2013. Commercial banking activities were terminated by selling Konzum Bank (2003/2004). The strategy developed in 2002 prescribed the structure and activities necessary for the performance of classic development banking activities and ensured adaptation to the principles of Hungarian economic policy. It promoted preparation for EU accession as well as compliance with the international requirements to be met by the bank. This strategy provided the basis for the organization of a single banking group – a system with a "cleaned up" profile – around MFB in 2006. In order to clearly identify the structure and functions within the banking group, MFB and its owner, the Hungarian State, jointly decided on the improvement of the strategy and its extension to the period 2007–2013.

However, the 2008 financial crisis led to a change in plans. Borrowing to invest practically stopped in the Hungarian financial market, and commercial banks were virtually unable to access funds. Corporate and household lending decelerated and became expensive, and subsequently sovereign debt management reached a critical state, which was followed by a rapid and significant depreciation of the forint. In the situation, MFB's role appreciated in the field of lending to both companies and local authorities showing a highly increased demand for short-term working capital loans as well as for long-term funding. By 2009, MFB had ultimately become a key crisis management institution.

Amid the deepening crisis, MFB's role fundamentally changed in 2010. In parallel with the in-depth transformation of the Hungarian State, the Government entrusted MFB with two tasks: the management of public assets worth some HUF 8 trillion (US$40 billion) and performing due diligence on its own portfolio while continuing the performance of development banking activities. After completing the due diligence process conducted from a financial, legal and IT perspective in respect of the assets entrusted to it, MFB put the company on track towards responsible management and cleaned up its own portfolio. As a result of these efforts, MFB closed the first two quarters with a positive balance in 2013.

The financial institution played a key role in facilitating access to of EU financial instruments by establishing a network of MFB Points in partnership with commercial banks. By the end of 2017, this network was accessible to businesses and retail customers at 642 locations. During the EU programming period from 2021 to 2027, businesses and retail customers can access financing through EU-funded loan programs via the MFB Pont Plus network of financial intermediaries.

Dr. Levente Sipos-Tompa was appointed CEO of the Hungarian Development Bank, effective April 1, 2019.

The bank's balance sheet and loan portfolio grew significantly during the COVID-19 pandemic and the energy crisis following the Russo-Ukrainian War, driven by its countercyclical policy.

At the end of 2021, MFB Zrt.'s capital was increased by HUF 45 billion, with an additional HUF 70 billion added in 2022 following a decision by the Minister of Economic Development. The current total share capital stands at HUF 519.9 billion.

== The structure of MFB, and the MFB Act ==
Act XX of 2001, as successively amended, states that MFB is a specialized credit institution operating as a private limited company having a single member, and 100% of its shares are held by the Hungarian State represented by the minister responsible for the supervision of state-owned assets. The founder has been represented by the Minister for National Development since June 2010. Therefore, the minister is capable of exercising the rights of the owner; however, the act of managing, decision-making, and controlling organs of the Bank are supervised by the board of directors and the supervisory board instead. The members of the board of directors are appointed – for a period of five years – and may be removed by the person exercising the rights of the owner. The board of directors elects its own chair from among its own members. The controlling organ of the bank is the supervisory board, whose chair is appointed and may be removed by the person exercising the rights of the owner. The work organization is headed by the CEO, who is an employee of MFB Zrt. The auditor of MFB Zrt. is appointed for a definite period of time by the person exercising the rights of the owner.

The MFB Act also defines the tasks and financial service provision activities of the bank. It also provides rules regarding conflict of interest and confidentiality. An example of the former is that the members/employees of the board of directors and the supervisory board of MFB Zrt. shall not hold office in political parties or undertake any public role in the name or interest of any political party, except for participation, as a candidate, in parliamentary or local elections.

== MFB Points and MFB Points Plus Network ==
The Hungarian Development Bank (MFB) launched the MFB Points network during the 2014-2020 programming period to facilitate the distribution of EU funds through repayable financial instruments, such as loans.

In the 2021-2027 period, both businesses and retail customers can access EU-funded loan programs through the MFB Pont Plus network, a system of financial intermediaries. For corporate clients, the MFB Pont Plus network comprises 156 branches, while retail clients have access to 266 branches, all of which are designated branches of commercial banks.

=== Capital market transactions ===
MFB Zrt. independently raises funds in both domestic and international money and capital markets. These funds are used to finance development loans, programs, and projects, with repayment guaranteed by the Hungarian State. MFB Zrt. is an active bond issuer on the Budapest Stock Exchange, including the issurance of green and social bonds.

== International memberships of MFB Zrt. ==
- European Association of Public Banks – EAPB
- European Venture Fund Investors Network – EVFIN
- Network of European Financial Institutions for SMEs – NEFI
- European Investment Fund – EIF
- European Association of Long-Term Investors – ELTI
- Banking Association for Central and Eastern Europe – BACEE
- Institute of International Finance – IIF
- International Chamber of Commerce, Hungary – ICC, Hungary

== International partners of MFB Zrt. ==
- European Investment Bank – EIB
- European Investment Fund – EIF
- Council of Europe Development Bank – CEB
- European Commission – EC

== The MFB Banking Group ==
The MFB Act provides an itemized list of the companies that belong to the MFB Banking Group. A company may be a member of the MFB Banking Group on either of two legal bases. One group comprises those business organizations in which MFB exercises the rights of the owner on behalf of the Hungarian State, and the other comprises those in which MFB may hold ownership interest.

== Analyses ==
MFB Periscope is a monthly economic report published by the Hungarian Development Bank. In addition to interpreting current real economic and money market trends, it focuses on the Hungarian economy and describes recent developments in its wider environment, essentially from a corporate/banking perspective.

MFB Indicator is a large-scale biannual survey in which the Bank collects information from several hundreds of Hungarian business units using a questionnaire completed on a voluntary basis. The analysis based on the survey results is built around four indices: a macroeconomic index, a market index, a financing index and an investment index. The indices recorded since summer 2009 provide a thought provoking and detailed picture of the state and processes of the Hungarian economy.

The MFB Macroeconomic Analyses provide a periodical overview of global economic processes to help the assessment of the constraints and opportunities faced by the Hungarian economy in the context of international trends.

Key balance sheet data and results (HUF million)

| Description | Year 2020 | Year 2021 | Year 2022 | Year 2023 |
|---|---|---|---|---|
| Balance sheet total | 1,939,078 | 2,373,041 | 2,993,802 | 3,605,243 |
| Subscribed capital | 265,900 | 349,900 | 519,900 | 519,900 |
| Equity | 411,721 | 496,095 | 689,266 | 724,393 |
| Profit before tax | 4,969 | 10,049 | 29,418 | 31,311 |

== Awards ==
- In 2008, Euromoney included MFB in its list of the best managed financial institutions in Central and Eastern Europe
- On 20 August 2013, the Knight's Cross of the Hungarian Order of Merit (civil division) was awarded to Gém Erzsébet, senior economist of MFB

== Chairs ==
- Gyula Takácsy, 1991–1994
- Dr. Péter Medgyessy, 1994–1996
- Éva Hegedűs, 1996–1997
- Dr. Tamás Tétényi, 1997–1998
- Dr. Péter Patonai, 1998–2000
- Dr. Éva Búza, 2000–2001
- László Baranyay, 2001–2002
- György Zdeborsky, 2002–2010
- László Baranyay, 2010–2013
- Dániel Lontai, 2013–2016
- Tamás Bernáth, 2012-2019
- Dr. Levente Sipos-Tompa 2019-

== CEOs ==
- Dr. Miklós Bányai, 1991–1994
- Dr. Péter Medgyessy, 1994–1996
- Dr. András Huszty, 1996–1998
- Dr. Péter Patonai, 1998–2000
- Dr. Éva Búza, 2000–2001
- László Baranyay, 2001–2002
- Dr. János Erős, 2002–2010
- László Baranyay, 2010–2013
- Csaba Nagy, 2013–2016
- Tamás Bernáth, 2016-2019
- Dr. Levente Sipos-Tompa, 2019-2024
- Balázs Katona, 2025-2025
- Zsolt Kovács, 2025-2026
- János Gerendás, 2026-

== See also ==
- List of banks in Hungary
- European Long Term Investors
- List of national development banks
