= Italgas =

Italian natural gas company

Italgas S.p.A.

- The Italgas headquarters in Milan, located at Via Carlo Bo 11.
- Type: Società per azioni
- Traded as: BIT: IG; FTSE MIB
- Industry: Gas distribution, water services, energy efficiency, and it sectors
- Founded: 12 September 1837; 189 years ago in Turin, Italy
- Headquarters: Milan and Turin, Italy
- Key people: Paolo Ciocca (Chairman); Paolo Gallo (CEO)
- Revenue: €1,778.8 million (2024)
- Net income: €506.6 million (2024)
- Number of employees: 4,339 (2024)
- Website: www.italgas.it/en/

Italgas S.p.A. is an Italian Network Tech Company operating in the gas distribution, water services, energy efficiency, and IT sectors.

Following the acquisition of 2i Rete Gas, its main competitor, Italgas has become the largest gas distribution operator in Europe, managing a network of over 150,000 kilometers, with more than 12 million customers in Italy and in Greece, and approximately 6,500 employees. Through Nepta, the group's main company in the water sector, Italgas provides services, both directly and indirectly, to around 6.3 million people, primarily in the Italian regions of Lazio, Sicily, and Campania.

It is listed on the Borsa Italiana and included in the FTSE MIB index.

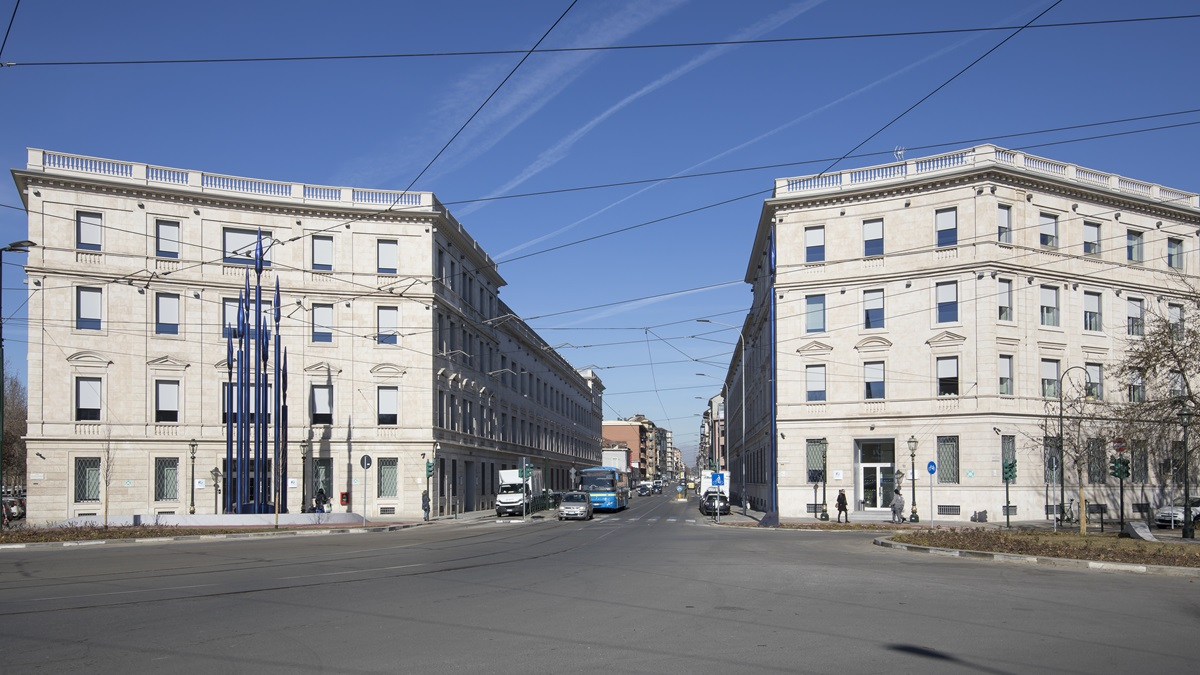
The historic headquarters of Italgas in Turin

== History ==
Italgas was founded in 1837 and is historically known for introducing gas into Italian homes, contributing to the country's economic and social development. Today, the company focuses on the digital transformation of gas distribution networks, supporting the decarbonization of the energy system and contributing to the European Union's climate objectives. Technological upgrades have enabled Italgas's networks to accommodate the distribution of alternative gases, including biomethane, synthetic methane, and hydrogen.

In August 1837, French engineer Hippolyte Gautier obtained approval for the charter of a Gas Lighting Company for the City of Turin. The company was formed as a joint-stock enterprise with an initial planned capital of 840,000 Piedmontese lire, of which 722,000 were subscribed by investors from Lyon. When Gautier realized that Turin’s bankers and silk merchants were willing to invest more than initially expected, he amended the company’s charter, and on 8 January 1838, the Anonymous Company for the Lighting of the City of Turin by Means of Hydrogen Carbide Gas was founded, with a share capital of 1,020,000 lire.

The Lyonnais and the Turin shareholders divided the responsibilities: the Lyon investors would handle the technical management of the company, while the Turin investors would oversee the administration, being closer to the administrative bodies of the Savoy state. As a result, the board of directors was composed solely of Turin members, even though the majority of the capital had been subscribed by the Lyon group.

In Turin, the company faced competition from other gas producers, particularly the Gas-Light Consumers’ Cooperative (Italgas), founded by several industries that used both forms of energy to power their machinery. Consequently, the Gas Lighting Company for the City of Turin sought new markets beyond the Piedmontese capital and secured concessions to manage gas distribution services in Palermo, Bergamo, and Cremona. In 1862, following this initial expansion, the company was renamed the Italian Gas Company (Società Italiana per il Gas), highlighting its new national scope. The 1880s marked the rise of electric energy, which would soon dominate lighting applications. Gas companies were therefore forced to explore new directions.

In 1900, Italgas was listed on the Milan Stock Exchange. During the 1920s, under the presidency of Panzarasa, the company pursued expansion by acquiring demunicipalized gas services and investing in related sectors such as chemical processing. In 1924, the company acquired control of the Société civile d’éclairage au gaz de la Ville de Venise, which had been managing gas distribution in Venice since 1839. Two years later, the company was renamed Società Veneta Industrie Gas (SVIG). In 1929, Italgas also took over the Florence-based operations of the Société Civile Lyonnaise, which had held the gas concession in Florence since 1847. The new company was named STAG. That same year, the Piedmontese company also acquired Società Romana Gas, which had been distributing gas in Rome since 1925, following its separation from Società Elettricità e Gas di Roma. The latter was the name adopted in 1923 by the Società Anglo-Romana per l'Illuminazione di Roma col Gas e altri sistemi, which had managed gas production and distribution in the capital since 1853. In the years leading up to the Second World War, Italgas’ history also featured the involvement of Catholic finance, led by Bernardino Nogara.

In 1930, Alfredo Frassati was appointed president of the company. His main task was to restore the company, which had been suffering the effects of the 1929 Great Depression. Starting in 1934, Frassati initiated a strict restructuring process, divesting from activities not directly related to gas production and distribution.

During the Second World War, gas service in Turin and throughout central and northern Italy faced severe restrictions due to the shortage of raw materials. Italgas facilities sustained significant damage from bombings and acts of war. During this period, the company began its first experiments with natural gas, and in 1950, the first urban gas distribution network was built in Lodi.

=== Joining the ENI Group ===
In 1967, control of Italgas was acquired by ENI, the then Italian National Hydrocarbons Authority (Ente Nazionale Idrocarburi). Starting in the 1970s, Italgas played an important role in the natural gas conversion (methanization) of the country. In the 1980s, it established Italgas Sud, a new entity tasked with carrying out the major project of bringing natural gas infrastructure to Southern Italy (Mezzogiorno). In this period, the most significant event was the 1982 acquisition of the Compagnia Napoletana di Illuminazione e Scaldamento col Gas (abbreviated as Napoletanagas S.p.A.), which had been distributing gas in Naples since 1862.

Between the late 1980s and early 1990s, Italgas expanded into the drinking water and urban solid waste management sectors before refocusing on natural gas. At the same time, international expansion continued through subsidiaries operating in Argentina, Brazil, Greece, Portugal, Spain, and Hungary, employing over 10,000 people.

=== The delisting and subsequent return to the Stock Exchange ===
In November 2002, as part of a broader restructuring of its activities, Eni launched a takeover bid for all outstanding shares of Italgas. The following year, after more than 150 years, Italgas was delisted from the Milan Stock Exchange. Subsequently, Eni consolidated its regulated gas operations under Snam, creating a new Group encompassing the various segments of the gas supply chain: transportation through Snam Rete Gas, storage via Stogit, regasification through GNL Italia, and distribution with Italgas.

=== Legal investigations ===
In July 2014 the company was placed under administration by commissioners due to dealings with various suppliers subject to administration as a result of mafia infiltration. The measure was enacted in response to suspected mafia infiltration linked to contracts awarded to the Cavallotti family, entrepreneurs from Belmonte Mezzagno (Palermo), who were subject to preventive measures for mafia association and considered to have ties to Cosa Nostra figures such as Benedetto Spera and Bernardo Provenzano. The Cavallotti family, who had been acquitted in the criminal trial, had ongoing contracts with Italgas in various parts of Italy. To address the situation, Judge Silvana Saguto and her colleagues placed the company under judicial administration by four court-appointed administrators, followed by a three-year period of judicial oversight.

However, this second measure was revoked after one year, in July 2016, by the Court of Appeal, which found that the conditions for such a measure were not met. In the meantime, a scandal emerged concerning the management of seized and confiscated assets – the so-called “Saguto system” – involving allegations that court-appointed administrators were repeatedly selected in exchange for personal benefits, including economic or employment advantages for relatives of the Judge, according to the charges brought by the Caltanissetta Prosecutor’s Office.

Silvana Saguto was subsequently disbarred by the High Council of the Judiciary (CSM) at the outset of the trial in Caltanissetta. Among those facing trial alongside her are close family members (including her father, husband, and one of her sons), as well as judicial administrators and assistants. Judge Lorenzo Chiaramonte also stands trial in the same case. Another judge, Fabio Licata, was convicted in an expedited trial – confirmed on appeal – to a sentence of two years and four months for falsification of documents. One of the charges related to Licata allegedly signing a decree on behalf of Saguto, who was on leave at the time, to place Italgas under judicial administration.

=== Return to the stock exchange ===
On 7 November 2016, Italgas separated from the Snam Group and returned to being listed on the stock exchange. Paolo Gallo, the company’s general manager, was appointed chief executive officer.

In 2017, Italgas marked its 180th anniversary and introduced a new strategic direction focused on the digital transformation of networks and processes. This also included the integration of renewable gases into distribution infrastructure. In 2018, the company established the Digital Factory, later becoming part of Bludigit, the Group's digital services subsidiary. That same year, Italgas acquired 100% of Seaside (later renamed Geoside), entering the energy efficiency sector.

In 2020, two years after acquiring Medea, the main gas distribution operator in Sardinia, Italgas began the distribution of methane on the island, which had previously lacked access to this energy source.

In September 2022, following an international tender issued by the Greek government for the privatization of the national gas distribution sector, Italgas acquired 100% of Depa Infrastructure from the Hellenic Republic Asset Development Fund S.A. (HRADF) and Hellenic Petroleum S.A. (HELPE). In February 2024, the acquired companies were renamed: the holding company became Enaon, and the operating company Enaon EDA.

In 2023, Italgas re-entered the water sector by acquiring from Veolia Environnement S.A. the business unit managing water service concessions in Italy. The transaction involved services – provided directly or indirectly – to approximately 6.3 million people. These activities were incorporated into a new company, NEPTA, part of the Italgas Group. The focus of NEPTA is on the digital transformation of water infrastructure, to reduce network losses and improve service performance.

Between 2024 and 2025, Italgas acquired control of 2i Rete Gas, the second-largest gas distribution operator in Italy. The acquisition included a network covering more than 72,000 kilometers and service to over 2,200 municipalities. Italgas became the largest gas distribution operator in Europe. On 1 July 2025, 2i Rete Gas was merged by incorporation into Italgas Reti, the Group's main subsidiary.

In 2025, following the renewal of the board of directors, Paolo Ciocca was appointed Chair of the Board, and Paolo Gallo was confirmed for a fourth term as chief executive officer.

== Major shareholders ==
As of 31 December 2024

- CDP Reti S.p.A. – 26.0%
- Snam S.p.A. – 13.5%
- Lazard Asset Management LLC – 9.8%
- BlackRock – 3.7%
- Sun Life Financial – 3.2%
- Bank of Italy – 1.3%
- Other institutional shareholders – 32.8%
- Retail shareholders – 9.6%

== The Historical Archive and the Heritage Lab ==
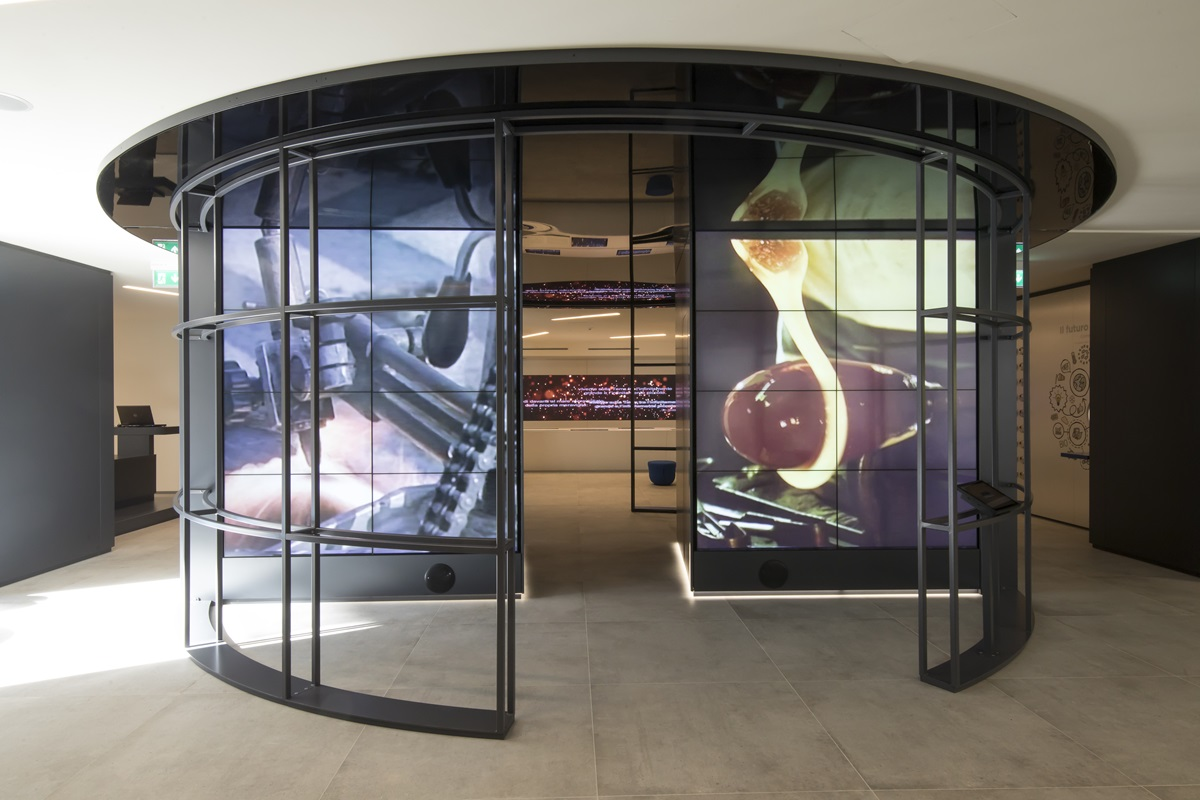
The Heritage Lab at Largo Regio Parco 11 in Turin

The renovated Italgas Historical Archive and Museum, originally established in Turin in 1984, is now known as Heritage Lab Italgas and is located at the Italgas headquarters in Largo Regio Parco. Developed in collaboration with the Giorgio Cini Foundation, the project introduced new methodologies for describing, inventorying, and digitizing the company's archival materials. It also includes the cataloguing of the historical library, newspaper collection, and museum holdings – some of which are accessible through virtual reality applications – and the 3D scanning of technical and scientific items in the collection.

The Italgas Historical Archive spans approximately three linear kilometers of documents. Materials from the original company and its subsidiaries and affiliates include documents dating from 1239 (mainly parchments) to 1990.

== Logo ==
Italgas logo until 2026

Current Italgas logo
