= Cassa Depositi e Prestiti =

Italian investment bank

CDP S.p.A.

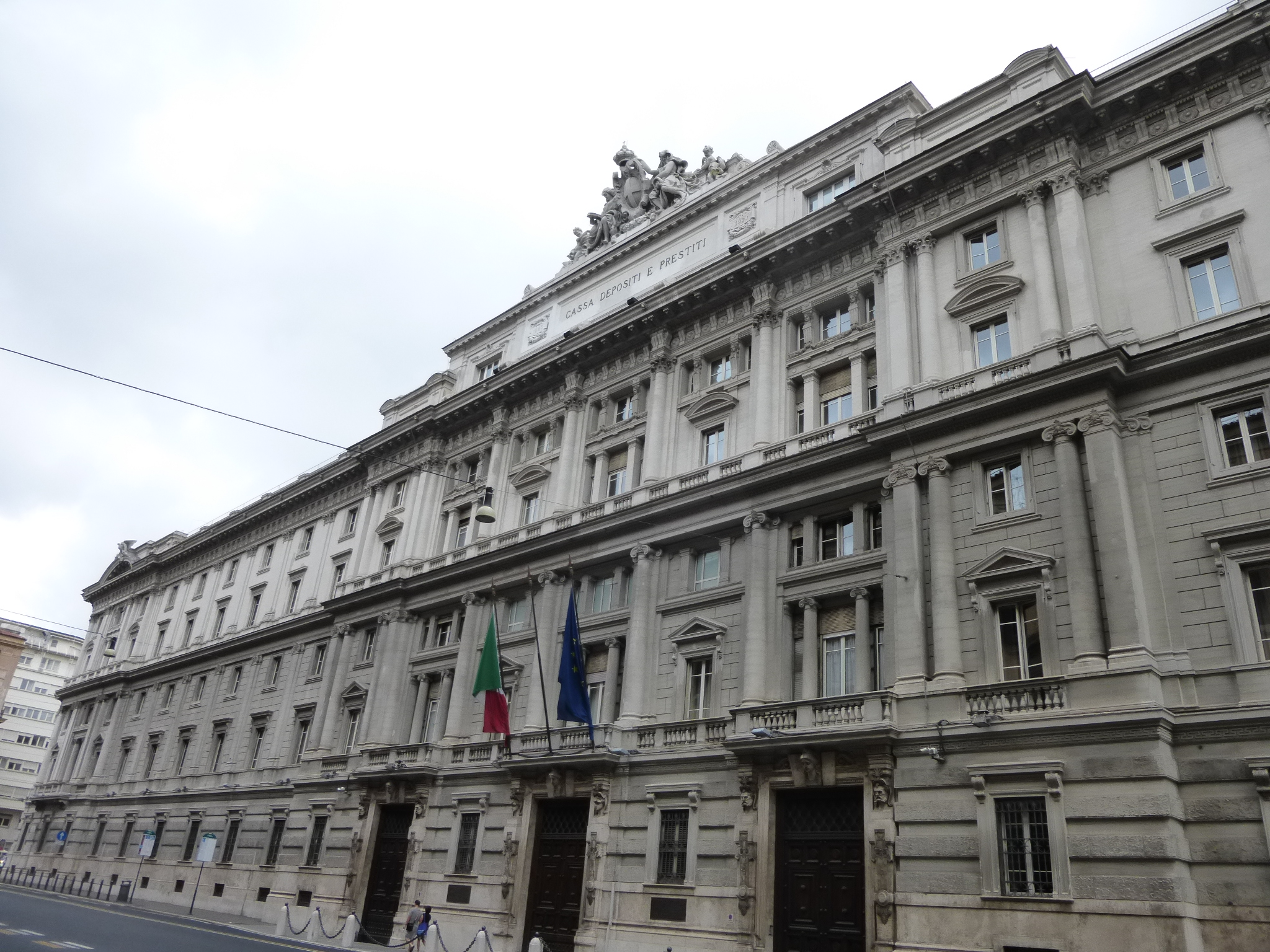
- Native name: Cassa Depositi e Prestiti S.p.A.
- Type: Società per azioni
- Industry: Banking industry
- Founded: 1850; 176 years ago
- Founder: Kingdom of Sardinia
- Headquarters: Rome, Italy
- Area served: Italy
- Key people: Dario Scannapieco (CEO); Giovanni Gorno Tempini (Chairman)
- Net income: 6,000,000,000 euro (2024)
- Total assets: €390.502 billion (Q2 2025)
- Number of employees: 2,142 (2024)
- Subsidiaries: CDP Equity (100%); CDP Reti (59.1%); Fintecna (100%); SIMEST (76%); CDP Immobiliare (100%); CDP Real Asset SGR (70%)
- Website: www.cdp.it

Cassa Depositi e Prestiti S.p.A., also known as CDP S.p.A., is a prominent Italian public development bank founded on 20 November 1850, in Turin. Its original duty was to finance public works like roads and waterworks during the reign of Victor Emmanuel II of Italy, King of Sardinia-Piedmont. CDP is the major Italian institution for economic development through long-term investments at local, regional and national level and acts as the government's arm for executing public policy mandates. It is also among the founders (with Caisse des Dépots, KfW and European Investment Bank) of the D20 Long-Term Investors Club (D20-LTIC), a group that gathers 18 major financial institutions and institutional investors from all over the world, mainly from G20 countries, and a member of the European Long Term Investors (ELTI), an association that brings together the main European national promotional banks.

== History ==
=== Early beginnings ===
The institution was initially created under the name Cassa Piemontese by Act of the Parliament of the Kingdom of Sardinia No. 1097 of 18 November 1850. Its main purpose was to mobilise capital received by the State through private savings collection channels for public utility works. In 1857, it was reorganised for the first time at the instigation of the first Cavour government.

After the unification of Italy, in 1863 it began to incorporate similar banks in the other states that gradually merged into the kingdom and followed, with its own headquarters, the relocation of the Italian capital, first to Florence and then to Rome. The bank gradually expanded its operations, offering new savings instruments, the proceeds of which were used for the CDP's institutional objectives, such as the construction of the Rome-Naples direct railway.

In 1875, Finance Minister Quintino Sella created the post office savings banks, which used the network of post offices to collect savings from the less affluent social classes, who did not have access to banks, especially in the countryside: deposits were made through postal savings books. 1896 saw the start of the issuance of the so-called Cartelle Postali, a form of public debt securities intended to consolidate the deficits of local public authorities, and two years later the Cassa was transformed into a general directorate of the Ministry of the Treasury.

Francesco Saverio Nitti founded Crediop in 1919, in which the CDP held the largest shareholding. Similarly, in 1924 the Cassa participated in the establishment of the ICIPU. In 1924, postal savings bonds (buoni fruttiferi postali) were issued for the first time, securities with a fixed and guaranteed yield in small denominations so that even minimal investments could be collected; this issue was so successful that the issue of Ordinary Treasury Bonds was temporarily suspended. In the following year, postal savings bonds were also issued in dollars and sterling, mainly intended for emigrants.

=== Italian Republic, 1946–present ===
Over time, the legal form of the Cassa Depositi e Prestiti also changed: it started out as a bank, albeit under the aegis of the State, but was first transformed into a general directorate of the Ministry of the Treasury (1898) and then became fully autonomous with the enactment of Law No 197 of 13 May 1983, after which it was recognised as having its own legal status, distinct from that of the State, with Law No 68 of 19 March 1993.

Decree Law No. 269 of 30 September 2003 transformed it into a joint-stock company by taking over the rights and obligations of the institution; the law also stipulated that a ministerial decree would regulate the functions and activities of the new company. The regulation was then issued by Decree of the Ministry of Economy and Finance of 5 December 2003. This allowed 65 banking foundations to join the shareholding structure, which were allocated preferred stocks amounting to 30% of the share capital.

On 1 January 2006, the operational structure changed again with the incorporation by Cassa Depositi e Prestiti of the Infrastrutture S.p.A. company, which had been established by CDP in 2002 for the purpose of financing, in various forms, the construction of infrastructure and large public works. Its sphere of operations encompasses various sectors: from large-scale industry to international cooperation, from the development of small and medium-sized enterprises to the support of their growth in size and internationalisation, from the support of public administration to the management of real estate, from the regeneration of tangible and intangible infrastructure to the facilitation of energy efficiency and technology transfer.

In late 2009, as credit conditions tightened after the 2008 financial crisis, CDP started lending to small and medium enterprises through banks. On 5 December 2018, the 2019-2021 Business Plan was approved with the aim of mobilising resources of €200 billion over three years to support businesses, infrastructure and the region. In 2021, the Patrimonio Rilancio fund was launched at CDP, originally intended to provide some 40 billion euros of financing; by 2023, it had invested just around 1 billion euros. In July 2022, rating agency Moody's cut the outlook from stable to negative, along with 13 other Italian financial institutions. Since 2023, CDP has increasingly been working on transactions to return to domestic ownership companies that were acquired by foreign investors. In 2023, Italy's government presented plans to set up an investment fund backed by CDP to promote startups investing in artificial intelligence (AI).

== Assets ==
Cassa Depositi e Prestiti manages the entire Italian Postal savings that represent its first source of financial resources. These resources are used by the bank to lend money to the Italian State or local governments, acquire strategic equities and invest in financial, infrastructural and economical projects considered strategic for the development of the Italian economy.

=== Data ===
==== Financial results ====
Esercizio	Consolidated net income (bn €)	Consolidated net equity (bn €)	Total assets (bn €)	Funding (bn €)	Resources deployed (bn €)
2024	6.0	48.0	478.0	398.0	24.6
2023	5.0	41.8	475.0	402.7	20.1
2022	6.8	39.7	478.1	406.3	30.6
2021	5.3	35.4	517.1	419.5	23.8
2020	1.2	33.7	512.4	417.1	38.6
2019	3.4	36.1	448.7	355.7	34.6

==== Long-term rating ====
- S&P's: BBB+
- Moody's: Baa3
- Fitch: BBB
- Scope: BBB+

== Shareholders ==
82.77% of the share capital is owned by the Italian Ministry of Economy and Finance, the 15.93% is held by various banking foundations and the remaining 1.30% by CDP itself with its own shares. Compagnia di San Paolo, Fondazione Cariplo, Fondazione Cassa di Risparmio di Torino, Fondazione di Sardegna are the only foundations to which share tranches above 1.5% have been allocated.

== Shareholdings and investments ==
The CDP Group:

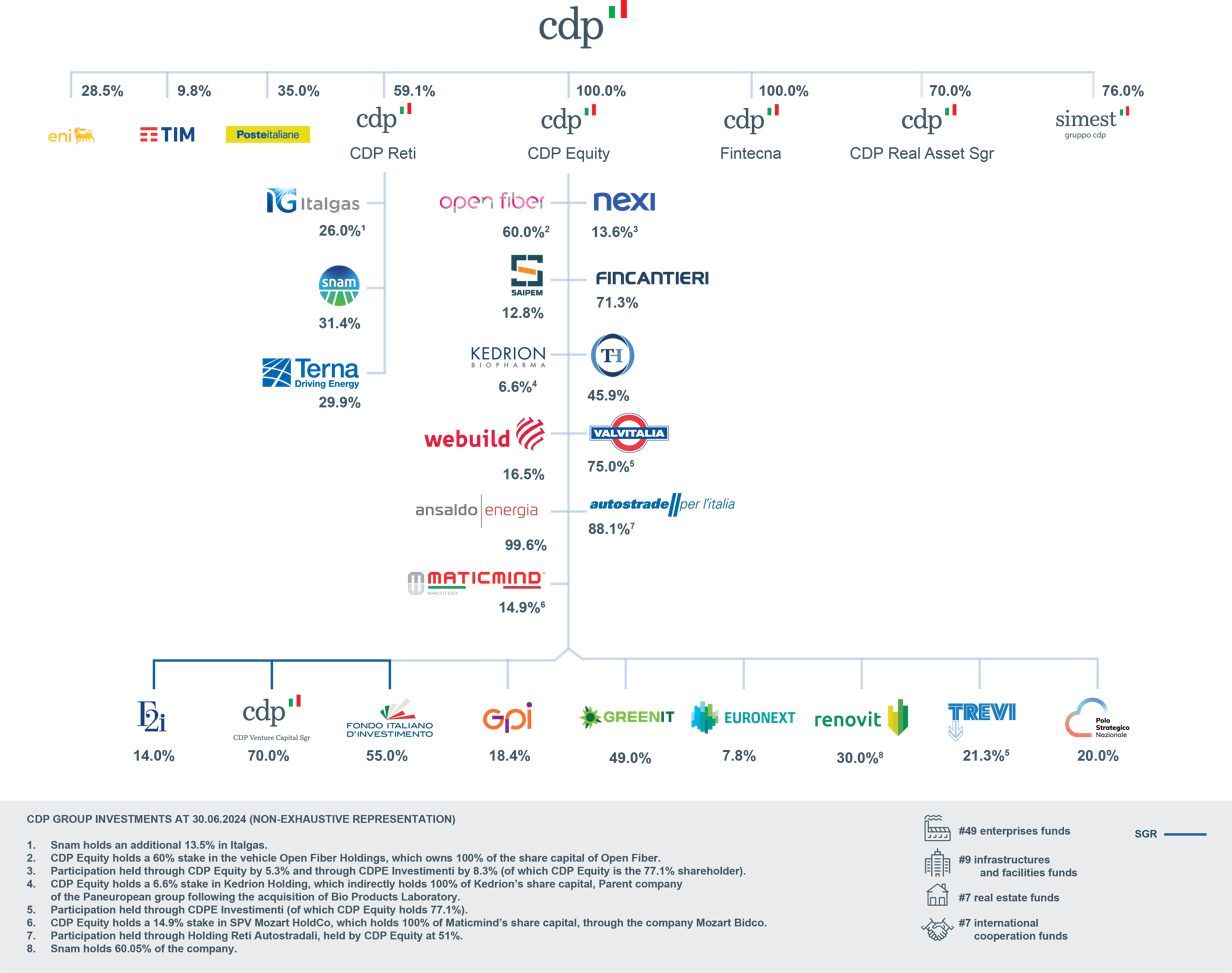

- CDP Equity (100%)
  - Ansaldo S.p.A (99.6%)
  - Saipem S.p.A (12.8%)
  - Fincantieri S.p.A. (71.3%)
  - Hotelturist S.p.A. (45.9%)
  - Webuild S.p.A. (16.4%)
  - GPI S.p.A. (18.4%)
  - Euronext N.V. (7.8%)
  - Renovit S.p.A (30%)
  - GreenIT S.p.A (49%)
  - Polo Strategico Nazionale S.p.A. (20%)
  - CDP Venture Capital SGR S.p.A. (70%)
  - Fondo Italiano d'Investimento SGR S.p.A. (55%)
  - F2i - Fondi Italiani per le Infrastrutture SGR S.p.A. (14%)
  - Holding Reti Autostradali (51%)
    - Autostrade per l'Italia S.p.A (88.1%)
  - Open Fiber Holdings S.p.A. (60%)
    - Open Fiber S.p.A (100%)
  - Mozart Holdco S.p.A. (14.9%)
    - Maticmind S.p.A (100%)
  - Kedrion Holding S.p.A. (6.6%)
  - CDPE Investimenti (72.1%)
  - Valvitalia S.p.A. (75%)
  - Nexi S.p.A. (8.2%)
  - Trevi Finanziaria Industriale S.p.A. (21.2%)
- CDP Reti (59.1%)
  - Terna S.p.A. (29.8%)
  - Snam S.p.A. (31.3%)
  - Italgas S.p.A. (25.9%)
- Fintecna S.p.A (100%)
- CDP Real Asset S.p.A (70%)
- SIMEST S.p.A (76%)
- Eni S.p.A. (28.5%)
- Poste Italiane S.p.A. (35%)
- Telecom Italia S.p.A. (9.8%)
- Istituto della Enciclopedia Italiana fondata da Giovanni Treccani S.p.A. (6.6%)
- Istituto per il Credito Sportivo (2.2%)
- Elite S.p.A. (15%)
- Redo SGR S.p.A. (30%)
- European Investment Fund (1.1%)

== Governance ==
=== Headquarters ===
Corporate headquarters is in Rome, Via Goito, 4 - 00185.

=== Chairs of the Board of Directors ===
- 2010–2015: Franco Bassanini
- 2015–2018: Claudio Costamagna
- 2018–2019: Massimo Tononi
- 2019–present: Giovanni Gorno Tempini

=== Chief Executive Officers ===
- 2010–2015: Giovanni Gorno Tempini
- 2015–2018: Fabio Gallia
- 2018–2021: Fabrizio Palermo
- 2021–present: Dario Scannapieco

== See also ==
- List of national development banks
- List of banks in Italy
