= Industrial Development Bank of Turkey =

Investment bank in Turkey

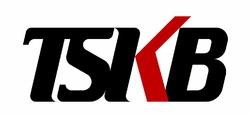
- Type: Private company
- Industry: Investment Banking
- Founded: 1950; 76 years ago
- Headquarters: Istanbul, Turkey
- Products: Economic development
- Revenue: ▲ ₺30.3 billion (2024)
- Operating income: ▲ ₺12.8 billion (2024)
- Net income: ▲ ₺10.3 billion (2024)
- Total assets: ▲ ₺237.5 billion (2024)
- Total equity: ▲ ₺33.5 billion (2024)
- Number of employees: 279
- Website: www.tskb.com.tr/en

The Industrial Development Bank of Turkey (TSKB) is a Turkish investment and development bank, established in 1950. When founded, it was the first privately owned investment bank in Turkey. It is headquartered in Istanbul, with branches in Ankara and Izmir.

TSKB has been supported by the World Bank. In early 2023, its P/E ratio was around 10. In 2022, it was rated B by Fitch.

TSKB is the 7th largest bank and the largest investment bank by shareholder's equity in Turkey as of late 2023.

The Industrial Development Bank of Turkey (TSKB), established in 1950, is Turkey's first and most prestigious private development bank and investment bank. Headquartered in Istanbul, the institution was founded as a joint initiative of the World Bank and the Government of the Republic of Turkey to support the development of the Turkish private sector. Having played a strategic role in Turkey's industrialisation drive for over seventy years since its establishment, TSKB today occupies a pioneering position in sustainable finance at both the national and regional levels. The bank executed Turkey's first green bond and sustainable bond issuances and is internationally recognised as a sector-leading institution in environmental, social, and governance (ESG) practices.

== Establishment and historical development ==
TSKB commenced operations as Turkey's first private sector development bank during a period following the Second World War when the country faced an acute foreign exchange shortage and pressing industrialisation needs. In its founding years, the bank was the sole institution capable of providing foreign currency loans essential for import financing and served as the only authorised body to conduct cash sales of foreign exchange allocated to Turkey under the Marshall Plan. Throughout the 1950s, TSKB laid the foundations of development banking in Turkey by channelling medium- and long-term project-based funding to the private sector whilst providing comprehensive technical advisory services to investors. The 1960s and 1970s marked a period during which TSKB left an indelible mark on Turkey's industrialisation process. Throughout this era, the bank provided financing for landmark projects that represented turning points for the national industry, including the first domestic bus, the first Turkish automobile, motor vehicle tyres, high-voltage cables, batteries, and synthetic fibre production. TSKB holds the distinction of being the first institution in Turkey to undergo independent external audit to international standards and carries the title of the International Finance Corporation's (IFC) first equity participation in Turkey. Furthermore, the bank assumed a founding role in shaping Turkey's capital markets, pioneering practices in the issuance, intermediation, and guarantee of corporate bonds. In subsequent periods, TSKB systematically diversified its resource base and international partnerships. Notable milestones during this era include the Samurai bond issuance in the Japanese capital market in the 1980s, the management of the Venture Capital Fund within the European Investment Bank in the 1990s, and the completion of the first international syndicated loans in the 2000s. Pioneering Role in Sustainable Finance

TSKB is a leader in sustainable banking in Turkey and the Eastern European region. The bank is not only the first Turkish financial institution to establish an Environmental Management System fully compliant with ISO 14001 standards but also the first Turkish bank to measure and neutralise its corporate carbon footprint. In 2008, 2009, and 2010, the bank was consecutively awarded "Sustainable Bank of the Year for Eastern Europe" in the assessment jointly organised by the Financial Times and the International Finance Corporation.

The year 2016 marked a watershed moment when TSKB elevated its leadership in sustainable finance to the international stage. That year, the bank became the first Turkish institution to issue green and sustainable bonds in international capital markets; in 2017, it achieved a global first in financial history with the issuance of a Sustainable Subordinated Bond. Following its membership in the United Nations Environment Programme Finance Initiative (UNEP FI), TSKB became one of the founding signatories of the UNEP FI Principles for Responsible Banking in 2019. The bank maintains the distinction of being the only Turkish bank represented in all prestigious international platforms, including the Long-Term Investors Club (LTIC), the European Long-Term Investors Association (ELTI), and the International Development Finance Club (IDFC).

== Corporate governance and international recognition ==
TSKB represents the highest standards of corporate governance practices in Turkey. The bank has achieved first place three times in the Corporate Governance Awards organised by the Corporate Governance Association of Turkey and is a permanent constituent of the Borsa Istanbul (BIST) Sustainability Index, which comprises companies demonstrating high corporate sustainability performance. In 2020, TSKB opened a new chapter in its corporate history by appointing a female executive to the position of Chief Executive Officer for the first time in its seventy-year history. The bank continues to advance its sustainability vision with determination, garnering international recognition for its initiatives in women's empowerment and inclusive finance.

== Ownership ==
TSKB is majority owned by banks, with over 55% of shares held. The full list of shareholders include:

- Türkiye İş Bankası, and its subsidiaries (47.68%)
- Vakıflar Bankası (8.38%)
- Held by public, via Borsa Istanbul (43.94%)

TSKB is traded in the Borsa Istanbul (BIST) under the ticker "TSKB".

== See also ==
- List of national development banks
