= Qatar Development Bank =

- Type: Public
- Industry: Bank and Finance
- Founded: 1997
- Headquarters: Grand Hamad Street; P.O.Box: 22789; Doha, Qatar
- Key people: Abdulaziz Bin Nasser Al-Khalifa, CEO; HE Ali Ahmad Al-Kuwari, Chairman
- Website: www.qdb.qa

Qatar Development Bank (QDB), previously known as Qatar Industrial Development Bank, is a bank in Qatar offering financial services, banking and loans to the development of the industrial, tourism, educational, health care, agricultural, animal resources and fisheries sectors of the Qatari economy. It was created in 1997 by Emiri Decree No. 14 with the objective of diversifying Qatar's economy by promoting developmental projects.

== Qatar Business Incubation Center ==
The Qatar Business Incubation Center (QBIC) was established in a joint venture by QDB and the Social Development Center in 2010, and officially started operating in March 2014. As the most extensive mixed-use incubator facility in the Middle East, its aim is to promote companies and finance business ideas. All the center's facilities are split up into stages and spread across 20,000 sq meters.

The center has signed many agreements with global companies to promote investments and swap knowledge; for example, in 2015, the center signed a memorandum of understanding (MOU) with Microsoft Qatar in order to encourage entrepreneurial ventures in Qatar's technology industry.

== See also ==
- List of national development banks
