= Claudio Costamagna =

Italian banker and businessman

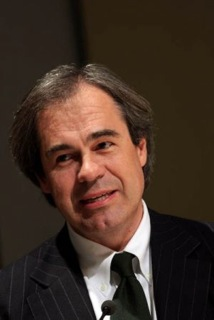
- Costamagna in 2014
- Born: 10 April 1956 (age 70); Milan, Italy
- Education: Università Commerciale Luigi Bocconi
- Occupations: Banker, businessman
- Known for: Chairman of Cassa Depositi e Prestiti (2015–2018)
- Awards: Bocconi Alumnus of the Year (2004), Guido Carli Award (2017)

Claudio Costamagna (born 10 April 1956, Milan) is an Italian banker and businessman. He was chairman of Cassa Depositi e Prestiti from July 2015 to July 2018.

Costamagna is chairman of CC & Soci Srl and sits on the board of FTI Consulting, a business advisory group listed on the NYSE. Costamagna is a member of the board of Finarvedi, holding company of the Arvedi Group, Italiana Petroli and Salini Costruttori, holding company through which the Salini family controls Webuild, a leading Italian construction company.

== Biography ==
Born in Milan in 1956, Costamagna attended the Ecole Européenne in Brussels before returning to Italy and enrolling at Università Commerciale Luigi Bocconi. In 1981 he was awarded a degree in business economics. He then began his career in the financial control area of Citibank, before moving in 1985 to Montedison, where he was Head of Corporate Finance for the holding company.

In 1988 Costamagna joined Goldman Sachs, initially as head of Investment Banking Italy, then becoming Country Head for Italy and Chairman of Goldman Sachs. In 1999, he was appointed Co-Head of the Investment Banking division EMEA and a member of the European Management Committee and the Global Partnership Committee. Between 2004 and 2006, the year in which he left the Group, Costamagna was Chairman of the Investment Banking division EMEA.

In 2006, he founded CC & Soci, a financial advisory company, where he is chairman. In 2011, he founded Advise Only, a firm specializing in personal finance and in online asset management advisory. From 2012 to January 2018 he was chairman of the European pharmaceutical group AAA-Advanced Accelerator Applications. The company focused on the development of diagnostic and therapeutic products in the field of nuclear medicine and was acquired by Novartis in January 2018 for 3.9 billion dollars. Costamagna was also chairman of Salini-Impregilo, Italy’s leading infrastructure construction group from 2012 to July 2015. In 2021, he launched a SPAC in Italy with Alberto Minali targeting the insurance sector.

Over the years, Costamagna has been a director of Luxottica, Bulgari, Il Sole 24 Ore Group, Autogrill, and DeA Capital, all companies listed on the Italian Stock Exchange. He was a board member of Virgin Group Holding and Reuters Breakingviews.

== Recognitions ==
In 2004 he was selected as “Bocconi Alumnus of the Year” by the ALUB association, of which all graduates of Università Commerciale Luigi Bocconi are members. In May 2017, Costamagna was given a Guido Carli award.
