= European Long Term Investors =

European Long Term Investors Association
- Abbreviation: ELTI
- Formation: July 2013; 12 years ago
- Founded at: Paris
- Type: Trade association
- Legal status: Non-profit aisbl
- Location: Brussels, Belgium
- Region served: Europe
- Members: 31 financial institutions (2024)
- Website: www.eltia.eu

The European Long-Term Investors Association (ELTI) is a trade association that represent a European-wide network of development banks or National Promotional Banks and Institutions (NPBIs).

As of 2020, the association has 31 European long-term financial institution members from 23 Member States across the European Union and Turkey.

== History ==
The association was established in 2013 by 16 NPBIs in Paris.

== Membership ==
The Full Members of ELTI are generally national development finance institution. The European Investment Bank (EIB) has the status of a permanent observer. ELTI also includes Associate Members notably multilateral development banks, regional financial institutions and non-banking institutions.

As of 2020, ELTI's 23 full members and 8 associate members include:

=== Full members ===
- Austria: Oesterreichische Kontrollbank (OeKB)
- Belgium: Belgian Federal Holding and Investment Company (SFPI/FPIM).
- Bulgaria: Bulgarian Development Bank (BDB)
- Croatia: Croatian bank for reconstruction and Development (HBOR)
- Czech Republic: Ceskomoravska zarucni a rozvojova banka (ČMZRB)
- France: la Banque publique d’investissement (Bpifrance)
- France: Caisse des dépôts et consignations (CDC)
- Germany: KfW Bankengruppe (KfW)
- Greece: National Bank of Greece (NBG)
- Hungary: Hungarian Development Bank (MFB)
- Ireland: Strategic Banking Corporation of Ireland (SBCI)
- Italy: Cassa Depositi e Prestiti (CDP)
- Latvia: The Latvian Development Finance Institution (ALTUM)
- Lithuania: JSC Public Investment Development Agency (VIPA)
- Luxembourg: Société Nationale de Crédit et d’Investissement (SNCI)
- Malta: Bank of Valletta (BOV)
- Malta: Malta Development Bank (MDB)
- Netherlands: Invest-NL
- Poland: Bank Gospodarstwa Krajowego (BGK)
- Portugal: Instituição Financeira de Desenvolvimento, S.A.(IFD)
- Slovakia: Slovak Investment Holding (SIH)
- Slovenia: Slovenska izvozna in razvojna banka (SID)
- Spain: Instituto de Crédito Oficial (ICO)

=== Associate Members ===
- Bulgaria: Fund Manager of Financial Instruments in Bulgaria (FMFIB)
- Council of Europe Development Bank (CEB)
- Germany: NRW.BANK
- Greece: Consignment Deposits and Loans Fund (CDLF)
- Lithuania: UAB Investicijų ir verslo garantijos (INVEGA)
- Long-Term Infrastructure Investors Association (LTIIA)
- Nordic Investment Bank (NIB)
- Turkey: Turkiye Sinai Kalkinma Bankasi A.S. (TSKB)

=== Permanent Observer ===
- The European Investment Bank (EIB)
