= CDP Reti =

Italian holding company

- Native name: Cassa Depositi e Prestiti Reti S.p.A.
- Company type: Società per azioni
- Industry: Investment management
- Founded: 2012; 13 years ago
- Founder: Cassa Depositi e Prestiti
- Headquarters: Rome, Italy
- Area served: Italy
- Key people: Massimo Tononi (chairman); Dario Scannapieco (CEO)
- Net income: ▼€189.097 million (2014)
- Total assets: ▲€5.037 billion (2014)
- Total equity: ▼€3.534 billion (2014)
- Owner: Cassa Depositi e Prestiti (59.1%); State Grid Europe (35%); Italian institutional investors (5.9%)
- Parent: CDP Group
- Website: www.cdpreti.it

Cassa Depositi e Prestiti Reti S.p.A. (also known as CDP Reti) is an Italian holding company. It is a joint venture of Cassa Depositi e Prestiti, State Grid Corporation and other investors.

The company owned 28.98% shares of Snam and 29.85% shares of Terna, as the largest shareholders.

In 2014 Cassa Depositi e Prestiti, the Italian state-owned investment bank, sold 35% shares of CDP Reti to State Grid Corporation, a state-owned company of China, for €2.1 billion. CDP also sold an additional 3.26% shares to banking foundations, most of which already were a minority shareholders of CDP.

In 2015 the company issued senior unsecured bond to raise €750 million.
