= Industrial Development Bank of Pakistan =

Stated-owned development bank in Pakistan

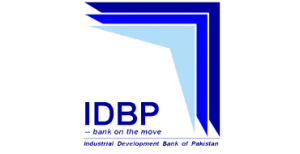
- Company type: Development bank (State owned)
- Industry: Financial services
- Founded: 1961; 65 years ago
- Founder: Government of Pakistan
- Headquarters: Karachi, Pakistan
- Area served: Pakistan
- Products: Development loans
- Owner: Government of Pakistan (57%); State Bank of Pakistan (36%); Provincial Governments (7%)
- Website: idbl.com.pk

Industrial Development Bank of Pakistan is a Pakistani state-owned development bank located in Karachi, Sindh, Pakistan. It is among the oldest financing institutions in Pakistan.

== History ==
The Industrial Development Bank of Pakistan (IDBP) was established on July 29, 1961, through the transformation of the Pakistan Industrial Finance Corporation (PIFCO). PIFCO, founded in February 1949 with a share capital of Rs. 20 million, was primarily funded by the Central Government (51 percent) and various institutional and individual investors (40 percent). Over its 12-year tenure, PIFCO allocated financial assistance of Rs. 293 million, directing a major portion (56 percent) to the jute and cotton industries, with the remainder distributed across 33 other sectors such as shipping, cement, and glass. PIFCO primarily facilitated loans exceeding Rs. 1 million but was constrained by its focus on existing enterprises and lacked the capability to support new ventures or lend against future assets.

Prompted by these limitations, the Credit Enquiry Commission was convened in 1959 to devise a more inclusive credit system for Pakistan’s evolving economic landscape. The commission recommended transforming PIFCO into an entity geared towards supporting medium-scale industries, with a revised upper lending limit of Rs. 1 million and new provisions for short-term industry credits and loans against prospective assets. Additionally, it suggested the provision of foreign exchange resources to the revamped institution.

Following these recommendations, the IDBP was created under the Industrial Development Bank of Pakistan Ordinance, inheriting PIFCO’s assets and liabilities. Initially, the IDBP had a share capital of Rs. 30 million, with the government holding a minimum stake of 51 percent. The bank's lending ceiling was established at Rs. 1 million for limited companies and Rs. 0.5 million for other enterprises, though certain sectors like mining and inland transport were exempt from these limits. Over time, the lending ceiling was adjusted to Rs. 2.5 million, with foreign exchange loans capped at Rs. 1.5 million.

The bank began its operations in early 1961. Credit facilities were extended to existing small industries and to new industrial units as outlined in the Small Industries Investment Schedule, which was issued by the government in November 1960. Over the years, however, the bank has become an institution fostering the growth of Small and Medium Enterprises in the rural/less developed regions of the country.

== Shareholding pattern ==
Industrial Development Bank of Pakistan is wholly owned by Pakistani Government entities with 57 percent of its shares held by the Federal Government, 36 percent by the State Bank of Pakistan and 7 percent by Provincial Governments and other public sector corporations. Its board of directors consists of representatives of the private sector appointed by the Ministry of Finance.

== Financials ==
The IDBP has suffered from significant losses due to loan defaults. By the mid-2000s, the IDBP had accumulated a loss of about Rs27 billion and was insolvent. The Pakistani government merged IBDP with the Profitable Investment Corporation of Pakistan in 2006 in part to improve IBDP's financial performance.

The bank continued to struggle commercially and by end of 2009 the accumulated deficit had risen to Rs28 billion. The Pakistani government continued to explore ways to make IDBP economically viable.

== Functions ==
=== Development banking business ===
- Provides guarantee, loans
- Provides medium and long term finances

=== Commercial banking business ===
- Bills
- Deposits
- Foreign Exchange accounts
- Guarantees
- Letter of Credit
- Remittances
- Short term advances

=== Merchant banking business ===
- Bridge Financing
- Leasing
- Underwriting of public issue of shares

=== Collection of utility bills ===
- Gas bills at branches in Karachi
- Telephone bills at all branches

== Branch Network ==
The Head Office of Industrial Development Bank of Pakistan is situated at Karachi, Sindh, Pakistan. The Bank currently operates with following 13 branches:

- In Capital Territory; Islamabad and Rawalpindi Branch (Part of the province of Punjab)
- In the province of Sindh; Main branch Karachi, Hyderabad and Larkana Branch
- In the province of Punjab; Faisalabad, Lahore and Multan Branch
- In the province of Khyber Pakhtunkhwa; Abbottabad and Peshawar Branch
- In the province of Balochistan; Quetta Branch
- In the province of Gilgit-Baltistan; Gilgit Branch
- In Azad Kashmir; Mirpur Azad Kashmir Branch

== See also ==
- List of national development banks
