= Ministry of Economy and Finance (Italy) =

Government ministry of Italy

- Ministero dell'Economia e delle Finanze

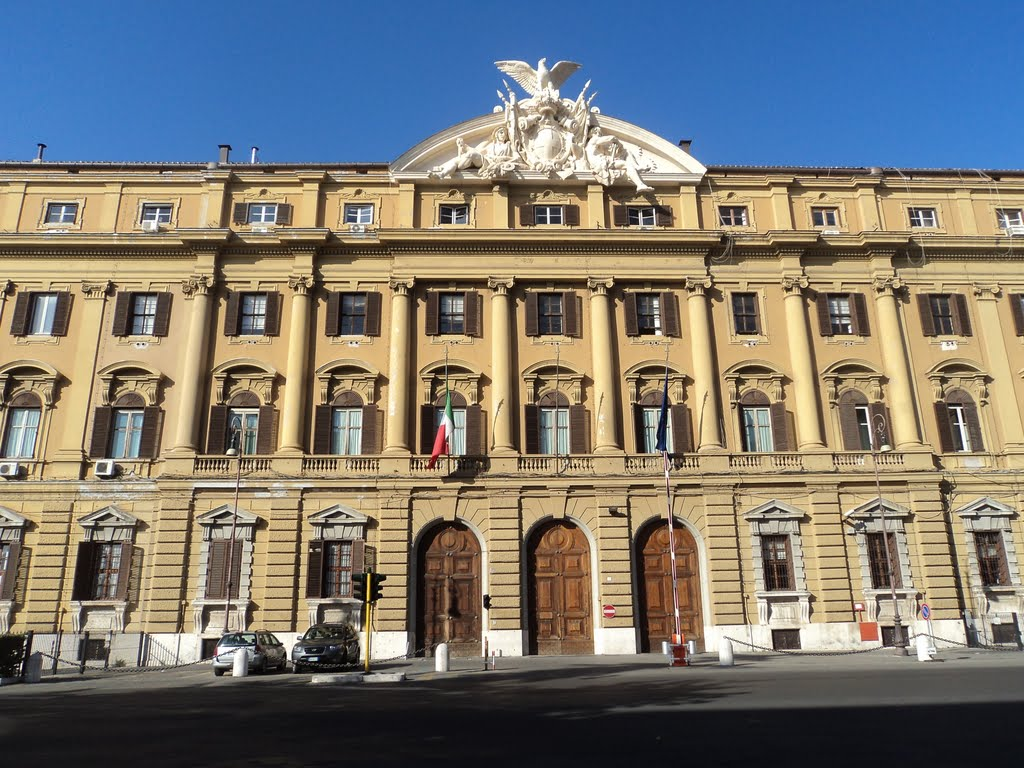
- Palazzo delle Finanze, headquarters of the Ministry of Economy and Finance

Ministry overview
- Formed: 2001; 25 years ago
- Preceding agencies: Ministry of the Treasury, Budget and Economic Planning; Ministry of Finances
- Jurisdiction: Government of Italy
- Headquarters: Via XX Settembre, 97 00187 Rome
- Minister responsible: Giancarlo Giorgetti
- Website: www.mef.gov.it

The Ministry of Economy and Finance (Italian: Ministero dell'Economia e delle Finanze), also known by the acronym MEF, is a ministry of the Italian government. Its responsibilities include overseeing economic policy, public investments and spending. The Ministry's headquarters are located in Rome's historic Palazzo delle Finanze. The current minister in the Meloni Cabinet is Giancarlo Giorgetti.

== History ==
Already in 1947, the De Gasperi III Cabinet tried to merge the pre-existing Ministries of Treasury and Finance, but it found a political opposition due to the great power concentrated in the hands of minister Pietro Campilli, and the project was abandoned for over fifty years.

MEF was created with the Bassanini reform, which unified the economic ministers with the legislative decree n. 300 of 1999. In 2001, the Berlusconi II Cabinet applied the reform and the MEF was created with the merger of former ministries: the Ministry of the Treasury, Budget and Economic Programming and the Ministry of Finance.

Four fiscal agencies were connected to the Ministry: Agenzia delle entrate ('Revenue Agency'), Agenzia del territorio ('Land Registry'), Agenzia del demanio ('State Property') and Agenzia delle dogane e dei monopoli ('Customs and Monopolies'). These entities are completely autonomous but they work closely with the MEF. In 2012, Agenzia del territorio was merged into the Agenzia delle entrate, while the Agenzia delle dogane absorbed the Amministrazione autonoma dei monopoli di stato ('Autonomous Administration of State Monopolies').

== Functions ==
According to the legislative decree n. 300/1999, MEF carries out functions and purposes of the State about economic policies, public finance and budget in relation to the programming of public funding, coordination of public expenditure and its control, fiscal policies and the tributary system, properties of the State, cadastre and customs, planning, coordination and control of interventions for the economic, territorial and sectorial development and policies of cohesion.

MEF organizes and manages the State budget, including the fulfilment of treasury and verifies the related trends and cash flows, ensuring the operational connection with the accomplishments in the field of coverage of financial requirements. The Ministry verifies the quantification of the resulting charges of measures and changing of laws, and it monitors the public expenditure, coordinating and verifying its trends and doing the controls required by law.

The economic and financial planning is made by MEF, which coordinates and verifies the interventions for the economic development in territorial and sectoral fields and for the cohesion policies, with the help of the Chambers of Commerce. According to art. 56 of the legislative decree 300/1999, MEF analyses the fiscal system and the choices on the tributary and treasury entries at the national, community and international level, as well as on the coordination activities.

Its activity is coordinated with the four fiscal agencies, regulated by a dedicated agreement, to which the Ministry gives the goals to fulfil and appoints the directors.

MEF undergoes supervisory tasks on entities, activities and functions related to the relationship with the authorities of supervision and control required by law, according to the art. 23, paragraph 2 of the legislative decree 300/1999.

The minister of economics is a member of the Supreme Council of Defence.

== Organization ==
The Ministry has a complex central structure derived from the merging of former ministries and from various modifications: main variations have been made with the legislative decree n. 173 of 3 July 2003, and the decree of the President of Republic n. 227 of 3 July 2003. The Ministry was reorganized with the Presidential Decree n. 43 of 30 January 2008, which established offices in direct collaboration with the minister and proper departments of the MEF.

=== Main departments ===
- The Dipartimento del Tesoro (DT, 'Department of Treasury') performs consulting activities and technical support for economic policy choices of the Government, develops macroeconomic strategies and elaborates the planning documents. It analyses the economic, monetary and financial problems at the national and international level and manages the public debt. DT administers the shareholdings of the State and the financial interventions in the economy, it regulates and oversees the financial and credit system as well as the valorisation of public properties.
- The Ragioneria Generale dello Stato (RGS, 'General State Account') coordinates the budget policies and verifies trends of the public finance. Its main institutional purpose is to guarantee the correct management and the strict planning of the public resources, to give certainty to State accounts through verification and analysis of the public expenditure trends. The RGS exercises functions of control on the financial management of public entities.
- The Dipartimento delle Finanze (DF 'Finances Department') addresses and directs the overall national fiscal system and gives implementation to the Minister's directives regarding taxation. Its activity is finalized to plan and coordinate the strategies of tax policy, to control their application, evaluating the effects.
- The Dipartimento dell'Amministrazione Generale, del Personale e dei Servizi (DAG, 'Department of General Administration, Personnel and Services') manages the human resources of MEF and the organization of the informative system, as well as the institutional communication of the Ministry. The DAG gives services to other administrations in the field of purchases, payroll management of public employers and rationalization of properties.

=== Territorial departments ===
At the peripheral level, MEF is organized in Ragionerie Territoriali dello Stato (RTS, 'Territorial State Accounts'), which depend organically and functionally on the Dipartimento della Ragioneria Generale dello Stato ('Department of the General State Accounting').

Until 28 February 2011, there were also the Direzioni territoriali dell'economia e delle finanze (DTEF, 'Territorial Directions of Economy and Finance') depending on the Dipartimento dell'Amministrazione Generale, del Personale e dei Servizi ('Department of General Administration, Personnel and Services'), but the Ministerial Decree of 23 December 2010 established the interruption of its activities.

The functions of DTEFs have been absorbed mostly by the RTS but not all its personnel, because a part of it has passed to the Agency for Monopolies.

=== Fiscal agencies ===
Fiscal agencies are completely autonomous but they work closely to the Minister. The main entities are:

- Agenzia delle entrate ('Revenue Agency'), which collects taxes for the State (In 2012, it absorbed Agenzia del territorio, the agency which managed cadastral and cartographic services, real estate advertising services, technical estimates and the Observatory of Real Estate);
- Agenzia del demanio, which manages the State properties;
- Agenzia delle dogane e dei monopoli ('Customs and Monopolies Agency'), which manages the customs and, since 2012, it has the functions of the Amministrazione autonoma dei monopoli di Stato (AAMS, 'Autonomous Administration of State Monopolies').

Agencies have their own headquarters in Rome and peripheral offices throughout the national territory.

== Tributary justice ==
Within the Ministry, there is the Consiglio di presidenza della giustizia tributaria ('Presidential Council of Tributary Justice'), a body of self-government of tax judges with similar purposes to the High Council of the Judiciary. Tax judges operate in the tax commissions and have the status of honorary magistrates, and they are appointed by the Minister of Economy and Finances on designation of the Presidency Council of Tax Justice.

=== Guardia di Finanza ===
The Guardia di Finanza is a militarized police force with tasks regarding investigation, prevention and repression of administrative and penal violations in the field of taxation, customs, currency and fiscal as well as judicial police. The Guardia di Finanza is essentially responsible for dealing with financial crimes and smuggling; it has also evolved into Italy's primary agency for suppressing the illegal drug trade. It directly depends on the MEF and hierarchically on the General Command of Guardia di Finanza headquartered in Rome.

== Shareholdings ==
MEF holds shares in strategic companies and public entities. Main shareholdings are the followings:

=== Listed companies ===
- Banca Monte dei Paschi di Siena (4.863%)
- ENAV (53.28%)
- Enel (23.59%)
- Eni (2.166%)
- Leonardo (30.20%)
- Poste Italiane (29.26%)

=== Companies having listed financial instruments ===
- Amco spa - Asset management company S.p.A. (99,78%)
- Invitalia - Agenzia nazionale per l'attrazione degli investimenti e lo sviluppo d'impresa S.p.a (100%)
- CDP - Cassa Depositi e Prestiti S.p.a. (82.77%)
- Ferrovie dello Stato Italiane S.p.a. (100%)
- Rai Radiotelevisione Italiana S.p.a. (99.56%)
- Società per la Gestione di Attività - S.G.A. S.p.a. (100%)

=== Unlisted companies ===
- Arexpo S.p.a. (39.28%)
- Alitalia – Società Aerea Italiana S.p.A. (100%)
- Consap S.p.A. (100%)
- Consip S.p.A. (100%)
- Equitalia Giustizia S.p.a. (100%)
- EUR S.p.a. (90%)
- Gestore dei Servizi Energetici GSE S.p.A. (100%)
- INVIMIT SGR - Investimenti Immobiliari Italiani Società di Gestione del Risparmio S.p.a. (100%)
- Istituto Poligrafico e Zecca dello Stato S.p.A. (100%)
- ITA - Italia Trasporto Aereo S.p.A. (100%)
- Istituto Luce - Cinecittà S.r.l. (100%)
- MEFOP - Società per lo Sviluppo del Mercato dei Fondi Pensione S.p.A. (58.21%)
- Rete Autostrade Mediterranee S.p.A. (100%)
- SOGEI S.p.A. (100%)
- SOGESID S.p.A. (100%)
- SOGIN S.p.A. (100%)
- SOSE - Soluzioni per il sistema economico S.p.a. (88.8%)
- Sport e salute S.p.a (100%)
- STMicroelectronics Holding N.V. (50%)
- Studiare Sviluppo S.r.l. (100%)

== Overseen institutions ==
MEF oversees the following institutions:

- Cassa Ufficiali della Guardia di Finanza ('Fund for Officers of the Guardia di Finanza'), a social security and welfare entity reserved to the officers of the Guardia di Finanza established in 1934
- Fondo di previdenza per il personale appartenente ai ruoli di ispettori, sovrintendenti, appuntati, finanzieri della Guardia di Finanza ('Social Security Fund for the Personnel with the role of inspectors, superintendents, appointed, financiers of the Guardia di Finanza'), a social security entity for the personnel (except for the officers) of the Guardia di Finanza established in 1934
- Fondo di previdenza per il personale dell'ex Ministero delle Finanze ('Social Security Fund for the personnel of former Ministry of Finances'), a social security entity for the members of the former Ministry of Finances established in 1981 and regulated in 1984.

== See also ==
- Government of Italy
- Economy of Italy
- Guardia di Finanza
- Minister of Economy and Finance (Italy)
