= Trellis (graph) =

Regular graph used in coding theory

Convolutional code trellis diagram

A trellis is a graph whose nodes are ordered into vertical slices (time) with every node at almost every time connected to at least one node at an earlier and at least one node at a later time. The earliest and latest times in the trellis have only one node (hence the "almost" in the preceding sentence).

Trellises are used in encoders and decoders for communication theory and encryption. They are also the central datatype used in Baum–Welch algorithm or the Viterbi Algorithm for Hidden Markov Models.

The trellis graph is named for its similar appearance to an architectural trellis.

== See also ==
- Trellis modulation
- Trellis quantization
