= Richard James Boys =

British statistician (1960–2019)

- Born: 6 April 1960; Leeds, United Kingdom
- Died: 5 March 2019 (aged 58)
- Education: Newcastle University
- Known for: Bayesian inference
- Scientific career
- Fields: Statistics
- Workplaces: Newcastle University

Richard J. Boys (6 April 1960 – 5 March 2019) was a statistician best known for his contributions to the Bayesian inference, hidden Markov models and stochastic systems.

== Early life and education ==
Richard attended Newcastle University where he obtained a BSc in mathematics in 1981. He went on to do a Master's and a doctorate at the University of Sheffield, completing it in 1985.

== Early career ==
In 1986, Boys published his first paper “Screening in a Normal Model” which was co-written with Ian Dunsmore in Series B of the RSS’s journal. He was known for collaborating in his papers.

== Academic career ==
In the same year, he started a lectureship at Newcastle University and would stay at Newcastle for his whole career. In 1996, he became a senior lecturer, and in 2005, he became a Professor of Applied Statistics.

=== Bioinformatics ===
Around the end of the 1990s, Richard started to steer towards statistics in biology and was particularly interested in Markov models in segmenting DNA sequences. This led to him researching biological and computational stochastic systems. This widened out to stochastic systems in general, where most of his contributions lay.

=== Bayesian inference ===
His most cited paper “Bayesian inference for a stochastic kinetic model” was featured in the scientific journal Statistics in Computing in 2008. The paper outlined how exact Bayesian inference may be possible for the parameters of a general range of biochemical network models, which helped create a new field of research in computational biology.

Richard embarked on a long-standing collaboration with mathematicians and archaeologists and another statistician and colleague called Andrew Golightly. They researched inference for population dynamics during the Neolithic period, which led to archaeology, physics and statistics publications.

=== Australia ===
Richard had a liking to visiting Australia. He first visited the country in 2003 to attend a bioinformatics conference in Brisbane. He was also an Associate Investigator for the ARC Centre of Excellence for Mathematical and Statistical Frontier.

== Late career ==
He held a Deputy Head position from 2004 – 2009. He was also on the Newcastle University Senate for a term. By the time of his death, he was Head of Pure Mathematics and Statistics.

== See also ==
- Bayesian probability
- List of statisticians
