= Fabrizio Palermo =

Italian businessman (born 1971)

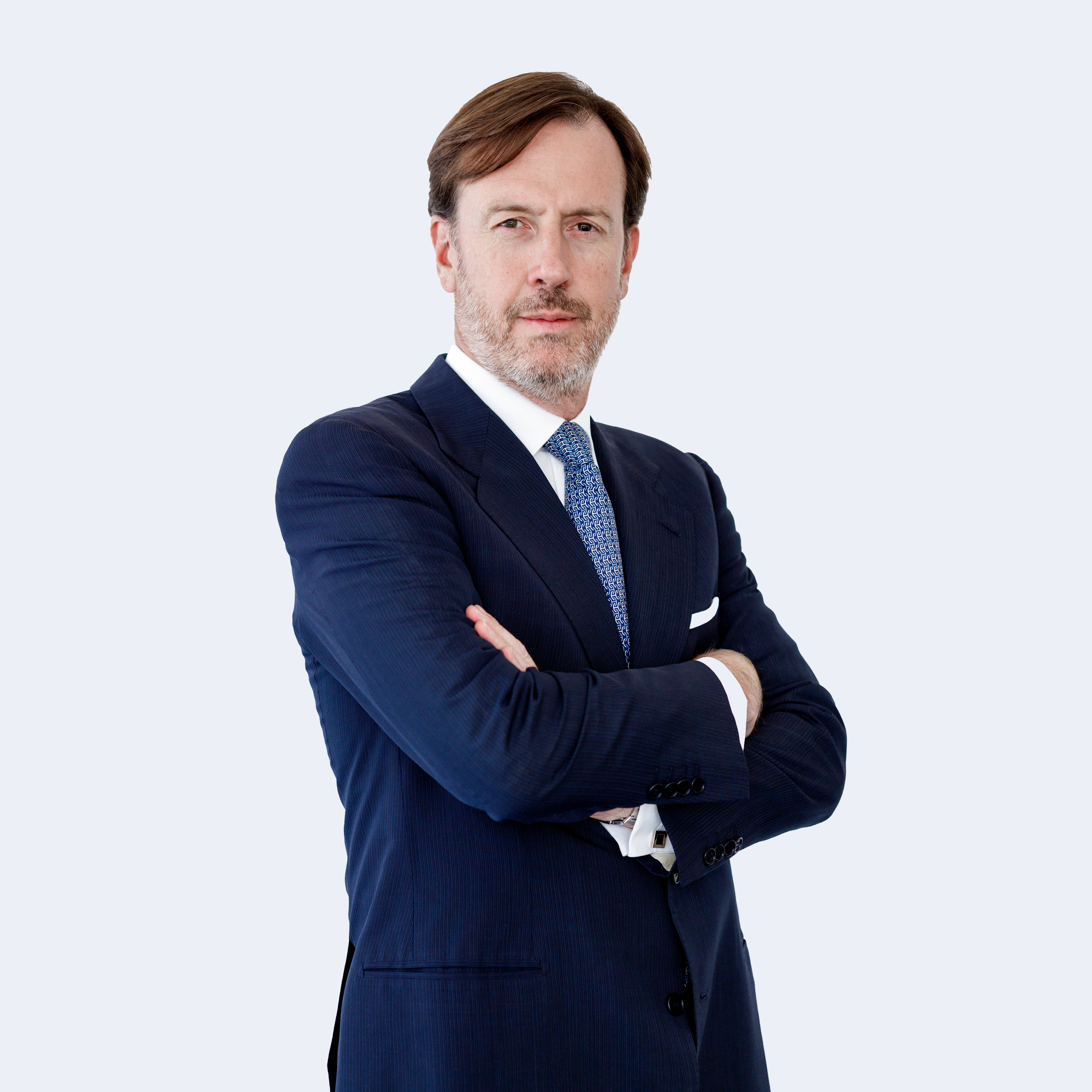
- Born: February 5, 1971 (age 55)
- Education: La Sapienza University
- Years active: 1995-present
- Title: CEO and GM

Fabrizio Palermo was born in Perugia February 5, 1971. Palermo was chief executive officer and General Manager of Cassa depositi e prestiti S.p.A. (CDP) and is currently the CEO and General Manager of Acea.

== Early life and education ==
Palermo graduated with honors in Business and Economics from La Sapienza University in Rome in 1994.

== Career ==
Palermo began his career in 1995, in the Investment Banking Division at Morgan Stanley in London, where he was responsible for equity and bond placements, corporate mergers and acquisitions.

From 1998 until 2005, Palermo was a strategic consultant at McKinsey & Company, specialising in corporate restructuring, transformation and turnaround projects for major industrial and financial groups.

In 2005, Palermo joined the Fincantieri Group as Business Development and Corporate Finance Director, reporting to the CEO, before taking on the role of Chief Financial Officer (2006-2014) and then Deputy General Manager (2011-2014).

From 2014 to 2018, he was chief financial officer and Financial Reporting Officer at Cassa depositi e prestiti Group, with responsibility for postal and bond funding, liquidity management, investment portfolio management and Group Asset and Liability Management (ALM).

Since 2017, Palermo has been a member of the Italian-French committee for the alliance project between Fincantieri and the Naval Group, a European shipbuilder.

On 27 July 2018, Palermo was appointed CEO of Cassa depositi e prestiti, on 4 October 2018, he also took up the position of General Manager. He has also served as a board member of Fincantieri USA Inc., Vard Group AS, Vard Holdings Limited, Risparmio Holding S.p.A. and Equam S.p.A. and as a member of the Italian Recovery Fund (formerly Atlante II) investor committee.

He was CEO of CDP RETI S.p.A from 2019 to 2021 and co-chairman of the Italy-China Business Forum.

On 26 September 2022, Parlermo was appointed chief executive officer of Acea and in May 2023 also became General Manager.

== Other activities ==
=== Corporate boards ===
- Assonime, Member of the Board of Directors (since 2020)
- Fincantieri S.p.A, Member of the Board of Directors
- Open Fiber S.p.A., Member of the Board of Directors
- Fondo Atlante, Member of the Investor Committee
- CDP Equity S.p.A., chair of the Board of Directors (2018–2019)

=== Non-profit organizations ===
- Centro Studi Americani, Member of the Board of Directors (since 2018)

Palermo was a member of the advisory board of the Italian Presidency of the B20.

== Controversy ==
In 2023, Italian daily newspaper La Repubblica ran articles citing Acea staff as saying Palermo had been abusive towards female hostesses working at the company. In response, Acea's board reaffirmed its "full confidence" in Palermo.

== See also ==
- Cassa depositi e prestiti
