= ACEA =

ACEA, AceA or Acea may refer to:

- Acea, a surname
- Acea (company), originally "Azienda Comunale Elettricità e Acque", an Italian energy and water supply company
- Arachidonyl-2'-chloroethylamide, a chemical compound
- Anglican Central Education Authority, education organization in the Bahamas
- European Automobile Manufacturers Association, known in French as "Association des Constructeurs Européens d'Automobiles" or ACEA
- GDP-mannose:cellobiosyl-diphosphopolyprenol alpha-mannosyltransferase, an enzyme
- Acea, the former Spanish name for Kiritimati

== See also ==
- Licostinel, code named ACEA-1021, a chemical compound
- Trosia acea (or T. acea), a species of moth
