= Turin Airport =

Turin Airport Aeroporto di Torino

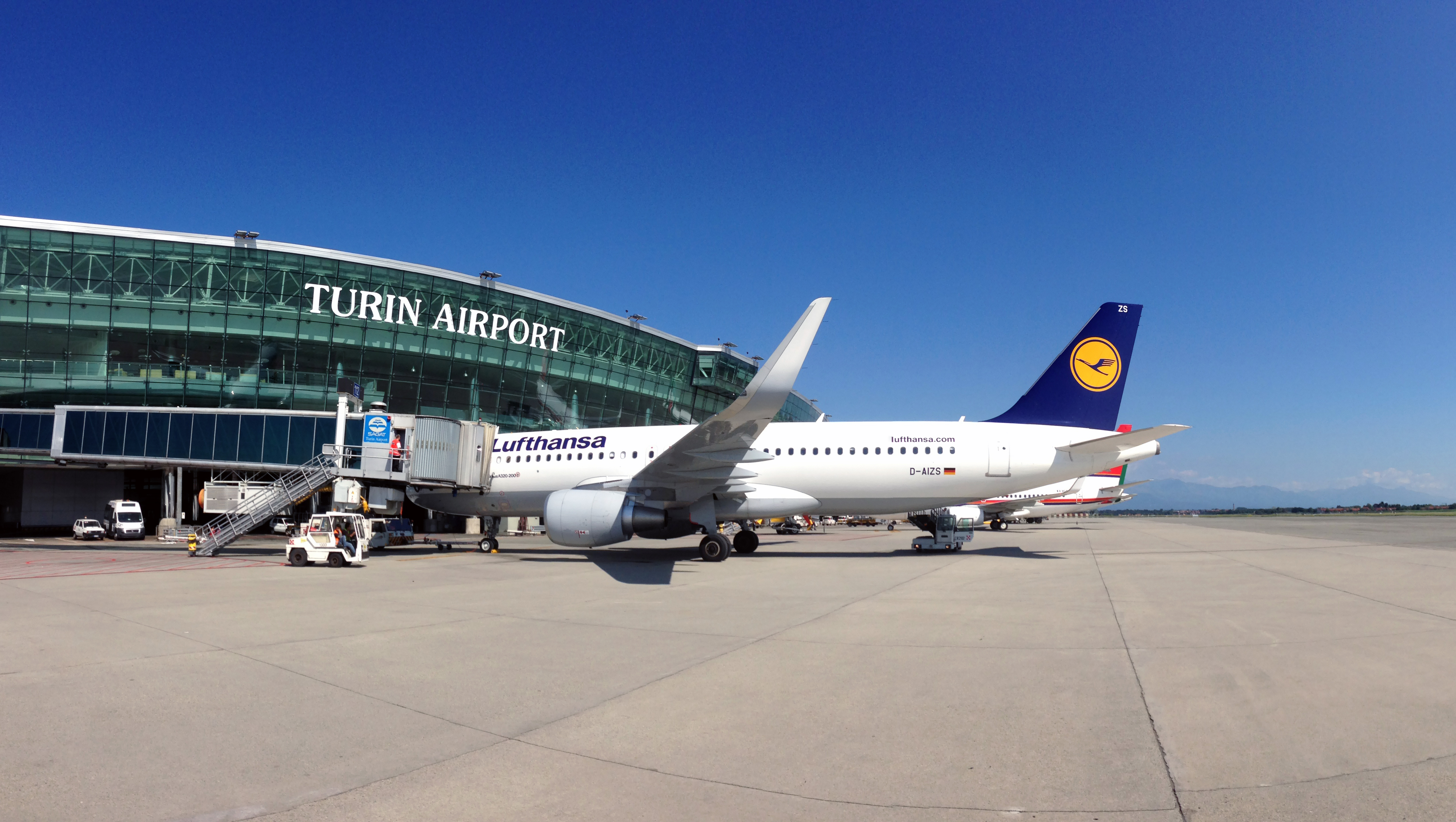
- IATA: TRN; ICAO: LIMF

Summary
- Airport type: Public
- Owner: Italian Infrastructures Investment Fund I
- Operator: Società Azionaria Gestione Aeroporto Torino
- Serves: Turin metropolitan area
- Location: Caselle Torinese, Italy
- Opened: 1953
- Focus city for: Ryanair; Wizz Air (from September 2026)
- Elevation AMSL: 989 ft (301 m)
- Coordinates: 45°12′09″N 007°38′58″E
- Website: aeroportoditorino.it

Map
- Location of airport in Italy TRN (Italy)

Runways
Direction	Length		Surface
Direction	m	ft	Surface
18/36	3,300	10,827	Asphalt

Statistics (2025)
- Passengers: 5,006,169
- Passenger change 23–24: ▲6.7%
- Aircraft movements: 44,005
- Movements change 23–24: ▲1.6%
- Cargo (ton): 473.7
- Cargo change 23–24: ▼ -25.8%
- Source: Italian AIP at EUROCONTROL; Statistics from Assaeroporti

Turin Airport (Italian: Aeroporto di Torino) (IATA: TRN, ICAO: LIMF), also known as Turin-Caselle Airport (Aeroporto di Torino-Caselle), is an international airport (civil and military) located at Caselle Torinese, 16 km (9.9 mi) north-northwest of the city of Turin, in the Metropolitan City of Turin, Piedmont region, Northern Italy. It has one runway, one passenger terminal, one cargo terminal and one general aviation terminal. It is also named Sandro Pertini Airport (Aeroporto Sandro Pertini), after former Italian President Sandro Pertini.

== History ==
The airport was built in 1953, on the site of a World War II air base, and was renovated in 1989 for the 1990 FIFA World Cup and then again in 2005 in preparation for the 2006 Winter Olympics. Turin airport won the ACI Europe Best Airport Awards in the category from 1 to 5 million passengers in 2007, 2008 and 2022. The aerodrome is operated by Società Azionaria Gestione Aeroporto Torino S.p.A. and administered by the Italian Civil Aviation Authority (ENAC). The air traffic service (ATS) authority is ENAV S.p.A.

== Facilities ==
The airport is at an elevation of 301 metres (989 ft) above mean sea level. It covers an area of more than 57,000 square metres (14 acres). The airport has one runway designated 18/36 with an asphalt surface measuring 3,300 by 60 metres (10,827 ft × 197 ft). The Runway 36 is ILS (Instrument Landing System) certified III B for approach with visual range less than 200 m (660 ft) but not less than 75 m (246 ft).

== Industry ==
The airport is also home to two Leonardo plants (North and South). These sites are specialized in the assembly and final phase of production, maintenance, ground tests and flight tests of military and civil prototypes and aircraft. In particular, aircraft such as the AMX-ACOL, the ATR 42 MP, the ATR 72 MP, the C-27J, the Eurofighter, the Tornado MLU and the Sky-X are produced.

== Airlines and destinations ==
The following airlines operate regular scheduled and charter services at Turin Airport:

Airlines	Destinations
Aer Lingus	Seasonal: Dublin
Aeroitalia	Comiso, Foggia, Salerno
Air Dolomiti	Frankfurt, Munich
Air France	Paris–Charles de Gaulle
airBaltic	Seasonal: Riga (begins 30 January 2027), Vilnius
British Airways	London–Gatwick
Dan Air	Bacău
easyJet	London–Gatwick; Seasonal: Bristol, London–Luton, Manchester
Eurowings	Seasonal charter: Stockholm–Arlanda
Finnair	Helsinki
Iberia	Madrid
ITA Airways	Rome–Fiumicino; Seasonal: Olbia
Jet2.com	Seasonal: Birmingham, Edinburgh, London–Gatwick (begins 13 December 2026), Manchester
KLM	Amsterdam
LOT Polish Airlines	Seasonal: Warsaw–Chopin (resumes 16 January 2027)
Royal Air Maroc	Casablanca
Ryanair	Athens (begins 28 March 2027), Barcelona, Bari, Bratislava (begins 26 October 2026), Brindisi, Budapest (resumes 25 October 2026), Cagliari, Catania, Charleroi, Copenhagen, Crotone, Dublin, Lamezia Terme, Lanzarote, London–Stansted, Madrid, Malta, Marrakesh, Naples, Palermo, Pescara, Porto, Reggio Calabria, Seville, Sofia (ends 24 October 2026), Tirana, Trapani, Valencia, Vilnius; Seasonal: Alicante, Belfast–International, Birmingham, Bristol, Corfu, Gdansk (begins 19 December 2026), Glasgow–Prestwick (begins 12 December 2026), Ibiza, Katowice (begins 19 December 2026), Kraków, Liverpool, London–Luton, Málaga, Manchester, Prague (begins 19 December 2026), Shannon, Stockholm–Arlanda, Warsaw–Chopin (begins 31 October 2026), Wrocław (begins 19 December 2026)
TUI Airways	Seasonal: Belfast–International, Birmingham, Bristol, Cardiff (begins 20 December 2026), East Midlands, Glasgow, London–Gatwick, London–Stansted, Manchester, Newcastle upon Tyne
Turkish Airlines	Istanbul
Volotea	Naples, Olbia, Paris–Orly
Vueling	Barcelona, Bilbao (begins 25 October 2026)
Wizz Air	Barcelona, Bilbao, Bucharest–Băneasa, Bucharest–Otopeni, Budapest, Catania, Chișinău , Iași, Lamezia Terme (begins 25 October 2026), London–Luton, Madrid (begins 25 October 2026), Málaga (begins 26 October 2026), Naples (begins 1 December 2026), Palermo, Rome–Fiumicino, Sharm El Sheikh (begins 27 October 2026), Sofia, Tirana, Valencia; Seasonal: Gdansk (begins 16 January 2027), Katowice (begins 16 January 2027), Prague (begins 16 January 2027), Warsaw–Chopin, Wrocław (begins 16 January 2027)

== Statistics ==
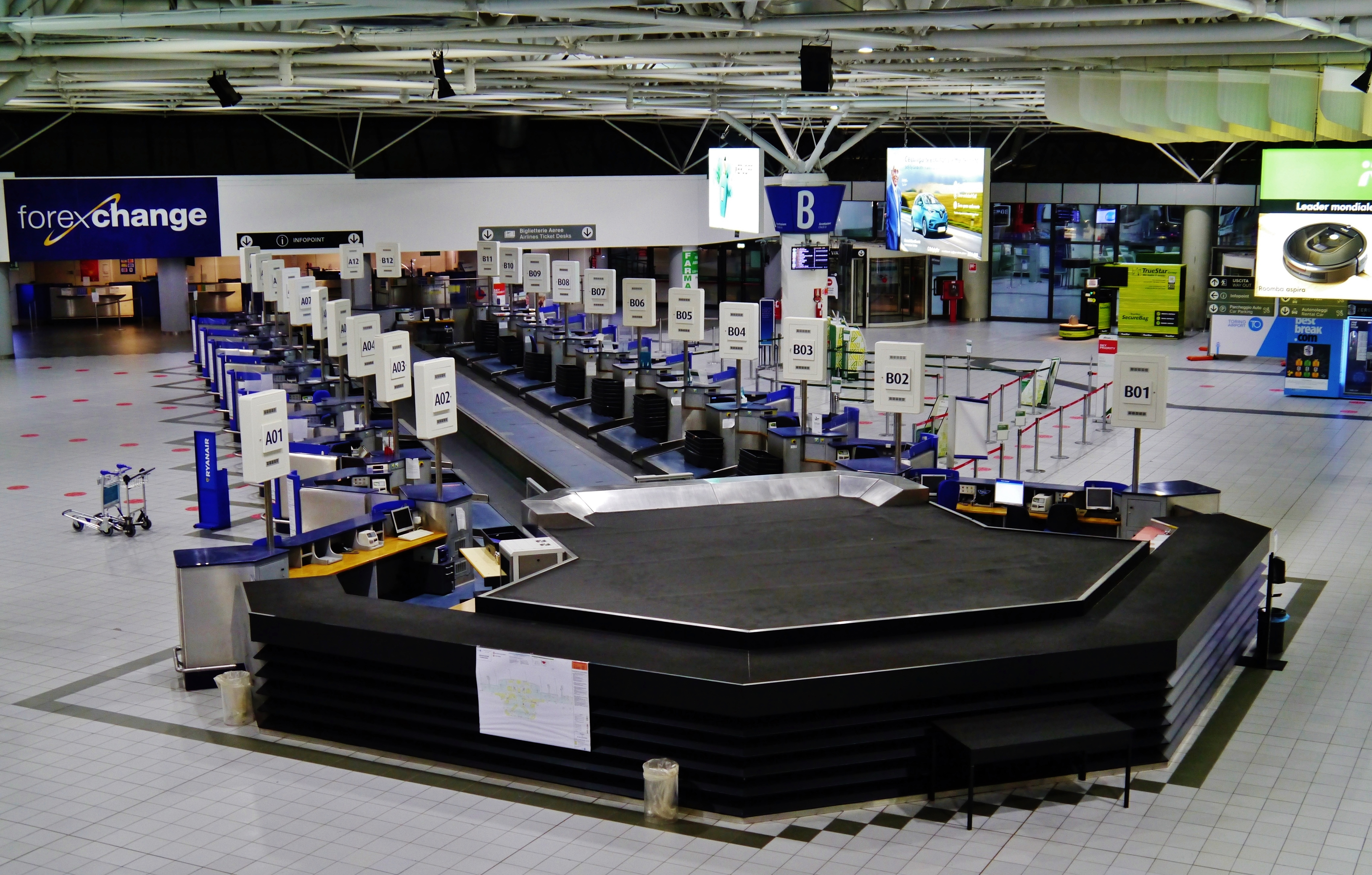
Check-in area

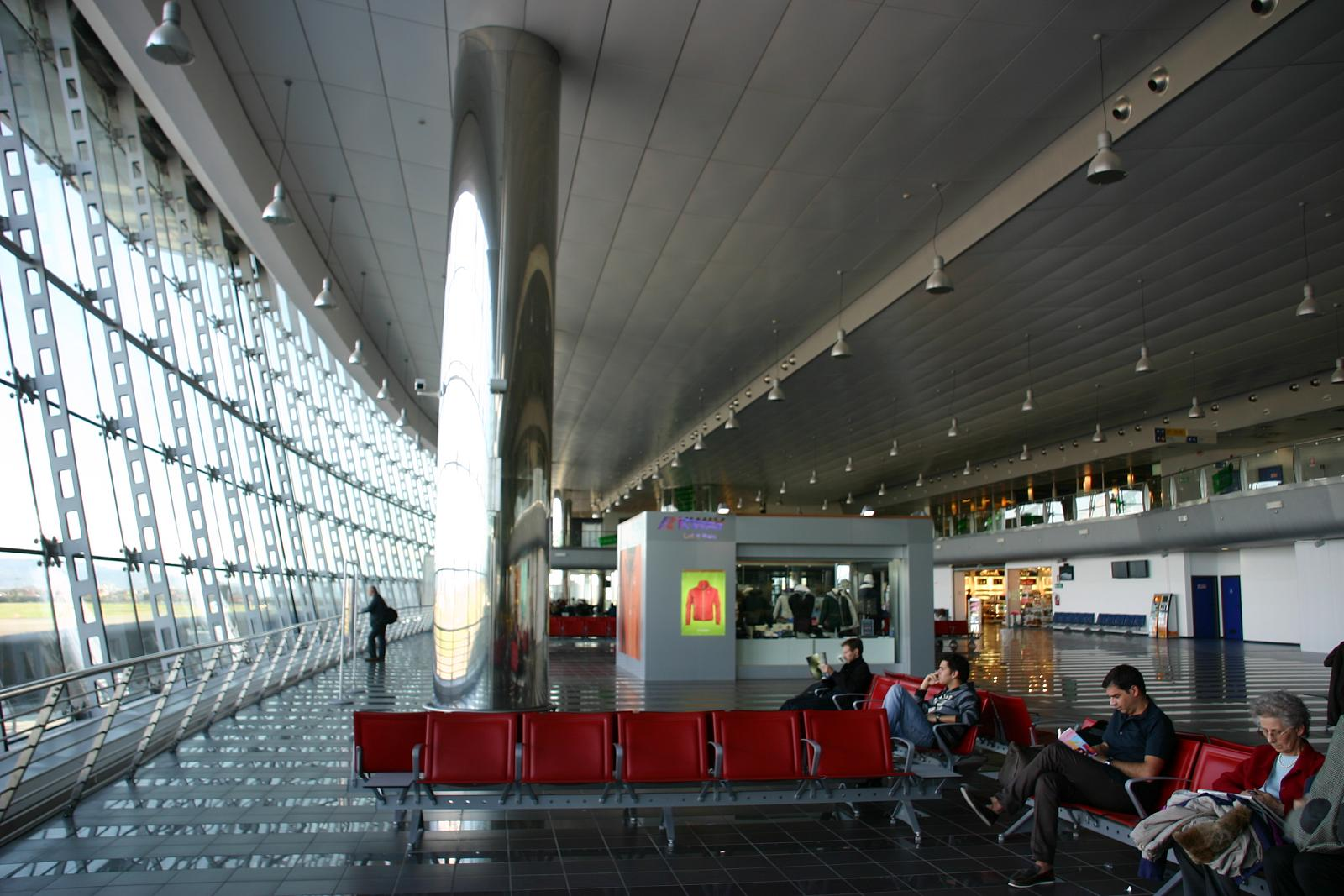
Departures area

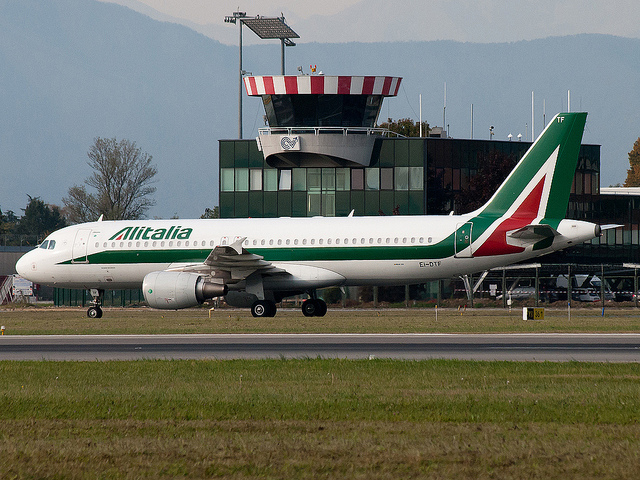
An Alitalia Airbus A320-200 taxiing at Turin Airport in front of the control tower

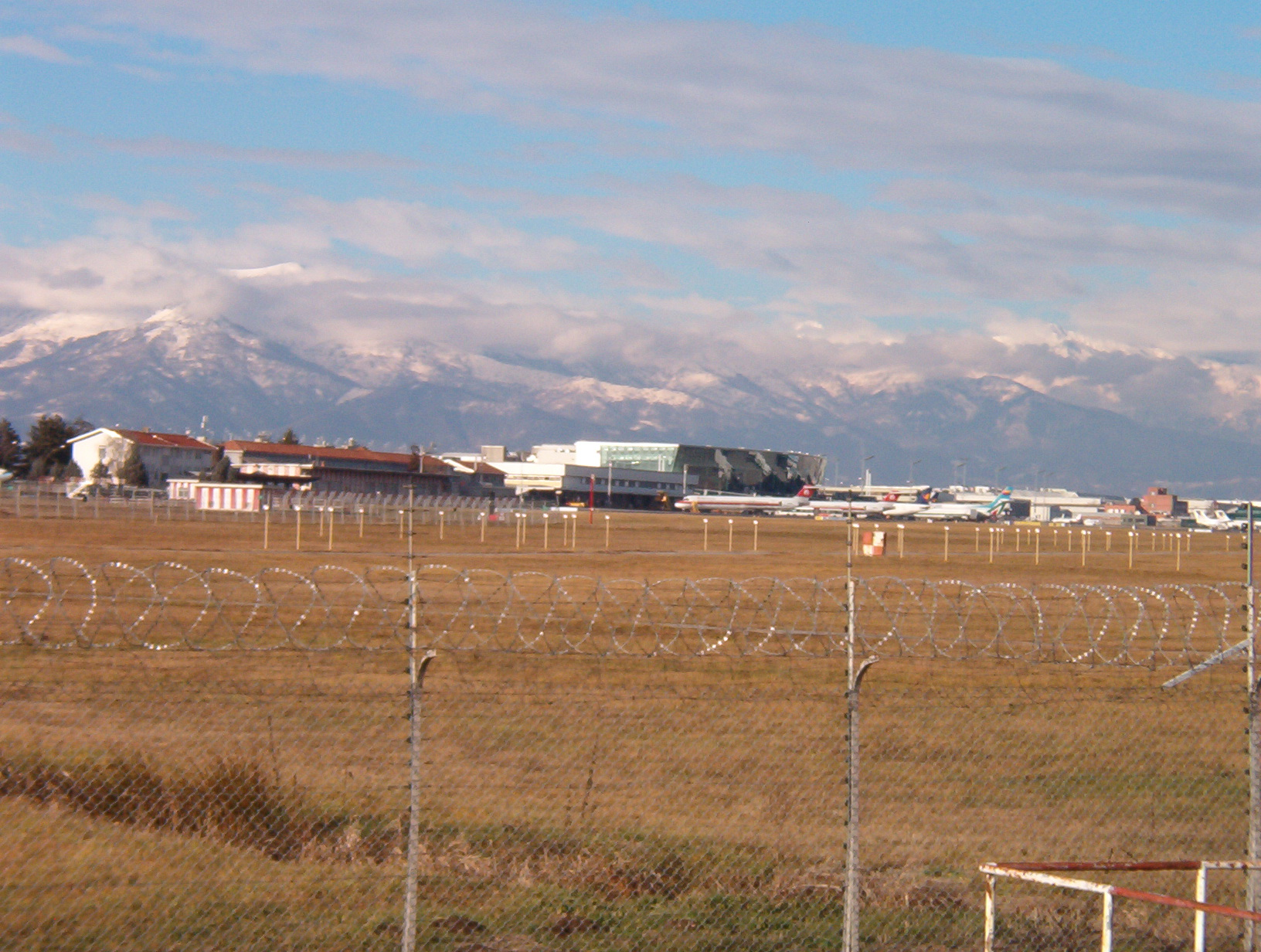
Apron view with the Italian Alps visible in the background

=== Passengers ===
Year	Passengers	Movements
2012	3,521,847	51,773
2011	3,710,485	54,541
2010	3,560,169	54,840
2009	3,227,258	56,419
2008	3,420,833	58,148
2007	3,509,253	62,136
2006	3,260,974	60,838
2005	3,148,807	56,890
2004	3,141,888	57,847
2003	2,820,448	54,710
2002	2,787,091	59,931
2001	2,820,762	64,885
2000	2,814,850	61,971
1999	2,498,775	
1998	2,464,173	
1997	2,391,902	
1996	2,009,532	
1995	1,836,407	
1994	1,758,936	

== Ground transportation ==
=== Rail ===
The airport is served by a railway station on the Turin–Ceres railway, which connects it to Turin city centre.

=== Bus ===
There is also a shuttle bus to Turin, operated by SADEM and Flibco. Additionally, there are also some scheduled shuttle services to nearby mountain towns and resorts including Ayas, Gressoney, Champorcher, Briançon, Vallée de la Clarée (Névache), Clavière, Cesana, Puy Saint Vincent, Montgenevre, and Serre Chevalier.

== Close encounter ==
On november the 20th, 1973, a globular luminous bluish white colored object was seen above the Turin airport. This object was observed by thousands of people in and around Turin. A pilot, Ricardo Marano, flying a Piper aircraft, tried to chase this luminous object. The object escaped and vanished while moving in southern direction. French journalist Jean-Claude Bourret investigated this case.
