= Società Azionaria Gestione Aeroporto Torino =

SAGAT
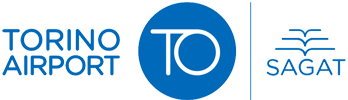
- Native name: Società Azionaria Gestione Aeroporto Torino S.p.A.
- Company type: private Società per Azioni
- Industry: Airport operator
- Headquarters: 12 Strada San Maurizio, Caselle Torinese, Italy
- Revenue: €58,161,615 (2014)
- Operating income: ▲€1,727,164 (2014)
- Net income: ▲€3,356,723 (2014)
- Total assets: ▼€118,553,793 (2014)
- Total equity: ▼€45,803,975 (2014)
- Owner: 2i Aeroporti (54.46%); Equiter (12.40%); FCT Holding (10%); Finpiemonte Partecipazioni (8%); Tecnoinfrastrutture (6.76%); Metropolitan City of Turin (5.00%); Aviapartner (0.42%)
- Parent: Italian Infrastructures Investment Fund I (ultimate); 2i Aeroporti (direct)
- Subsidiaries: Aeroporti Holding (55.45%)
- Website: Official website

Società Azionaria Gestione Aeroporto Torino S.p.A. (SAGAT) is the operator of Turin Airport. The controlling interests of the company was purchased by Italian Infrastructures Investment Fund I in January 2013.

== History ==
In December 2012 Italian Infrastructures Investment Fund I (F2i First Fund) acquired 28% stake of SAGAT from FCT Holding, a subsidiary of the Comune of Turin, for €35 million. The fund acquired a further 22.786% from Sintonia, a holding company for Benetton family in the same month. Sintonia sold their 24.385% stake to F2i and Tecnoinvestimenti (1.599%, a subsidiary of Tecno Holding, owned by several chambers of commerce), for €30.5 million, after failing to bid the stake held by the Comune of Turin. The shares held by Aeroporto Guglielmo Marconi di Bologna (4.13%) was purchased by 2i Aeroporti and Tecnoinvestimenti for €5.166 million on 27 January 2014. F2i First Fund sold 49% shares of 2i Aeroporti to Ardian and Crédit Agricole Assurances in February 2015.

== Shareholders ==
As of 31 December 2014

- 2i Aeroporti, a joint venture of Primo Fondo Italiano per le Infrastrutture, Ardian and Crédit Agricole Assurances (54.46%)
- Equiter, a subsidiary of Intesa Sanpaolo (12.40%)
- FCT Holding, a subsidiary of the Comune of Turin (10%)
- Finpiemonte Partecipazioni, a subsidiary of Piedmont Region (8%)
- Tecnoinfrastrutture, a subsidiary of Tecno Holding (6.76%)
- Metropolitan City of Turin (5.00%)
- Aviapartner (0.42%)
- treasury stock (2.96%)

== Subsidiaries ==
Aeroporti Holding S.r.l., a joint venture of SAGAT (55.45%), Equiter (35.31% stake) and Tecnoinfrastrutture (9.24%), was a minority owner of Aeroporto Guglielmo Marconi di Bologna (5.913%) and Aeroporto di Firenze (AdF; 33.402% stake), the operator of Bologna and Florence Airport, respectively. The minority interests in AdF was sold to Corporación América in February 2014.
