= Aeroporto Guglielmo Marconi di Bologna (company) =

Aeroporto di Bologna
- Native name: Aeroporto Guglielmo Marconi di Bologna
- Company type: Listed Società per Azioni
- Traded as: BIT: ADB; FTSE Italia Small Cap
- ISIN: IT0001006128
- Headquarters: 84 via Triumvirato, Bologna, Italy
- Revenue: ▼€76.889 million (2014)
- Operating income: ▲€21.370 million (2014)
- Net income: ▲€6.873 million (2014)
- Total assets: ▼€213.785 million (2014)
- Total equity: ▲€125.682 million (2014)
- Owner: Bologna Chamber of Commerce (37.559%); Amber Capital (15.082%); Strategic Capital Advisers (10.510%); Aeroporti Holding (5.913%); 2i Aeroporti (0.970%)
- Subsidiaries: Fast Freight Marconi (100%); Tag Bologna (51%)
- Website: Official website

Aeroporto Guglielmo Marconi di Bologna S.p.A. (AdB) is the operator of Bologna Guglielmo Marconi Airport, The company is listed in Borsa Italiana (Milan Stock Exchange).

== History ==
Aeroporto Guglielmo Marconi di Bologna and Società Azionaria Gestione Aeroporto Torino had a cross ownership until February 2014, which AdB sold their minority interests (4.13%) to 2i Aeroporti and Tecnoinvestimenti (a subsidiary of Tecno Holding) for €5.166 million.

== Shareholders ==
After the company was listed in the Milan Stock Exchange in 2015, Chamber of Commerce of Bologna was the major shareholders of 37.559% stake, followed by equity funds that runs by Amber Capital (15.082%) and Strategic Capital Advisers (10.510%). The fourth largest shareholders was 2i Aeroporti, which owned 0.970% shares directly, as well as through controlling interests in Aeroporti Holding, a subsidiary of Società Azionaria Gestione Aeroporto Torino (SAGAT) for 5.913% shares of AdB. 51% shares of 2i Aeroporti was owned by Primo Fondo Italiano per le Infrastrutture and around 45% shares of both SAGAT and Aeroporti Holding were owned by minority shareholders.

March 2016
company	number of shares	ratio
Chamber of Commerce of Bologna		37.559%
San Lazzaro Investments Spain (Amber Capital)		15.082%
Italian Airports Sarl (Strategic Capital Advisers)		10.510%
Aeroporti Holding (SAGAT of 2i Aeroporti)		5.913%
2i Aeroporti		0.970%
others (<2% each)		29.926%
Total	36,100,000	100%

31 December 2014
company	number of shares	ratio
Chamber of Commerce of Bologna	14,963,825	50.55%
Comune of Bologna	4,957,836	16.75%
Province of Bologna	2,960,000	10.00%
Emilia-Romagna Region	2,604,086	8.80%
Aeroporti Holding	2,134,614	7.21%
UniCredit	1,124,729	3.80%
others	557,307	1.88%
other local chamber of commerce	297,603	1.01%
Total	29,600,000	100%
