= Ravanelli =

Ravanelli is an Italian surname. Notable people with the surname include:

- Renato Ravanelli (born 1965), Italian corporate manager
- Fabrizio Ravanelli (born 1968), Italian football striker and football manager
- Simone Ravanelli (born 1995), Italian cyclist
- Luca Ravanelli (born 1997), Italian football defender

== See also ==
- Ravanelli (Brazilian footballer) (born 1997), Brazilian football attacking midfielder
