= Chiara Gamberale =

Italian writer and television presenter

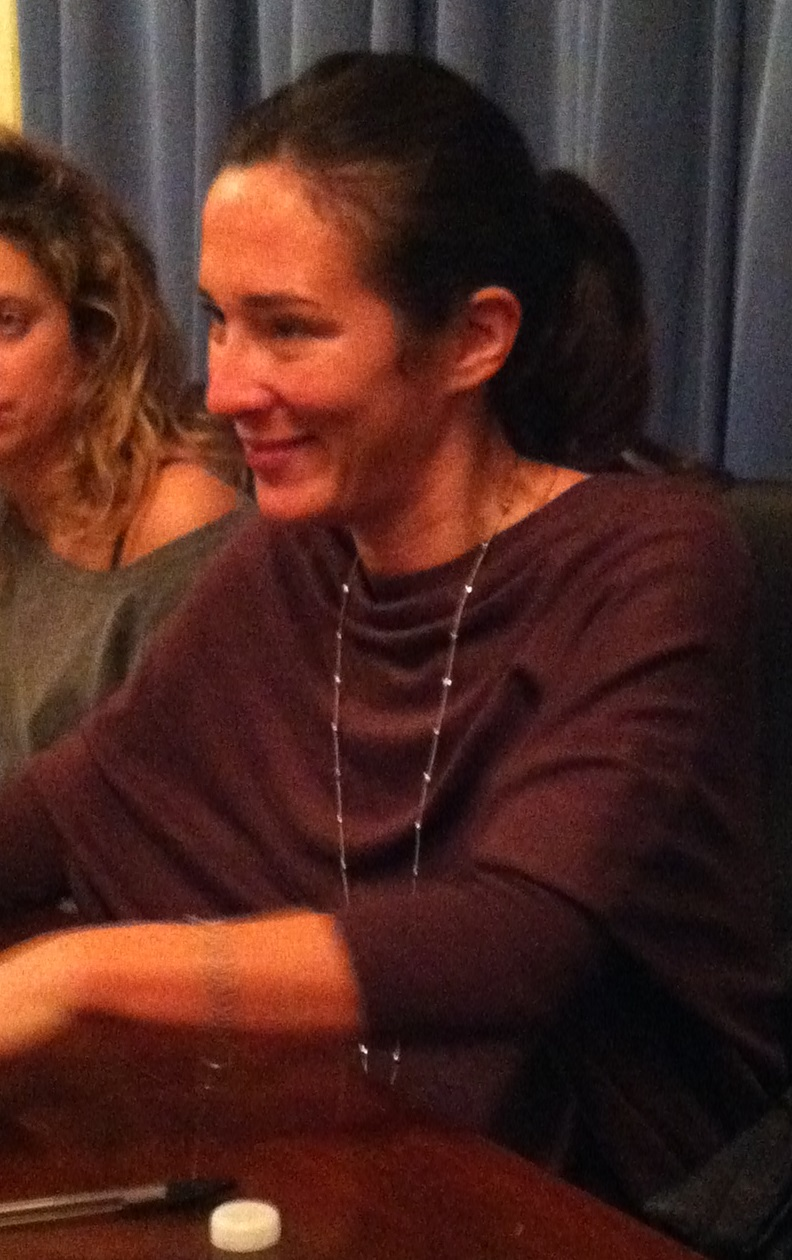

Chiara Gamberale (born 27 April 1977) is an Italian writer, television and radio presenter.

== Biography ==
Gamberale was born in Rome, Italy, on 27 April 1977. Her mother is an accountant and her father is Vito Gamberale.

Gamberale graduated in drama, Art and Music Studies (DAMS) at the University of Bologna.

In 1999, she published her first novel, Una vita sottile and in 1996, she won the young critics award Grinzane Cavour promoted by La Repubblica. In 2002, she began working as a television presenter, when Mariano Sabatini asked her to co-host Parola mia on Rai 3 alongside Luciano Rispoli. Subsequently, she hosted Quarto Piano Scala A Destra, as well as the cultural program Duende on the Lombard station Seimilano, and Io, Chiara e l'Oscuro on Rai Radio 2. She actively collaborates with the newspaper La Stampa and the Italian magazines Vanity Fair, Donna Moderna and IO Donna. Her book Una passione sinistra was used to develop the movie Passione sinistra by Marco Ponti. In 2008, she was a finalist for the Premio Campiello with her book La zona cieca.

In 2009, she married Emanuele Trevi, an Italian literary critic, writer and editor-in-chief. They divorced in 2011. In 2017, she had a daughter, named Vita, from a new partner Gianluca Foglia, the editorial director of the Italian publisher Feltrinelli.

== List of works ==
- Una vita sottile, Venezia, Marsilio, 1999; Milano, Fabbri, 2004
- Color lucciola, Venezia, Marsilio, 2001
- Arrivano i pagliacci, Milano, Mondadori, 2014
- La zona cieca, Milano, Feltrinelli, 2017
- Una passione sinistra, Milano, Corriere della sera, 2008; Milano, Bompiani, 2009
- Le luci nelle case degli altri, Milano, Mondadori, 2010
- L'amore quando c'era, Milano, Corriere della sera, 2011
- Quattro etti d'amore, grazie, Milano, Mondadori, 2014
- Per dieci minuti, Milano, Feltrinelli, 2013
- Avrò cura di te, di Chiara Gamberale e Massimo Gramellini, Longanesi, Milano, 2014
- Adesso, Milano, Feltrinelli, 2016
- Qualcosa, scritto da Chiara Gamberale e illustrato da Tuono Pettinato, ed. Longanesi, 2017
- L'isola dell'abbandono, Milano, Feltrinelli, 2019
- Come il mare in un bicchiere, Milano, Feltrinelli, 2022
