= CDP Equity =

Italian Investment Fund

CDP Equity S.p.A.
- Native name: Cassa Depositi e Prestiti Equity S.p.A.
- Formerly: Fondo Strategico Italiano S.p.A.
- Type: Società per azioni
- Industry: Financial services
- Founded: 2011; 15 years ago
- Founder: Cassa Depositi e Prestiti
- Headquarters: Palazzo Busca, Milan, Italy
- Area served: Italy
- Key people: Paolo Perrone (chairman); Fabio Barchiesi (CEO)
- Services: Merchant bank
- Net income: ▲€249.446 million (2014)
- Total assets: ▲€5.564 billion (2014)
- Total equity: ▲€4.833 billion (2014)
- Owner: Cassa Depositi e Prestiti (100%)
- Parent: CDP Group
- Subsidiaries: Open Fiber; Ansaldo Energia; Fincantieri
- Website: www.cdpequity.it
- Footnotes; In separate financial statements

Cassa Depositi e Prestiti Equity S.p.A. (formerly Fondo Strategico Italiano S.p.A.; FSI S.p.A.) also known as CDP Equity S.p.A., is a majority state-owned Italian sovereign wealth fund established in 2011. Its purpose is to invest in strategic Italian companies to help them to compete globally.

== History ==
The fund was established in 2011 as Fondo Strategico Italiano. Its mandate was to invest in strategic Italian companies to help them to compete globally. The fund's activity is restricted to healthy and profitable Italian businesses, with solid growth prospects, in need of capital injection to enlarge their business and be competitive on a global scale. The initial capital of the fund totalled €1 billion, with 90% of this sum contributed by CDP and 10% from Fintecna. The CDP is ready to inject a total amount of €4 billion.

The fund was set up by the state-controlled lender Cassa Depositi e Prestiti (CDP) on the directive of Economy Minister Giulio Tremonti, emulating a similar fund in France, allegedly after French dairy company Groupe Lactalis SA made a successful takeover bid for Parmalat.

The fund become a member of the International Forum of Sovereign Wealth Funds and signed up to the Santiago Principles on best precise on managing Sovereign Wealth Funds.

In September 2011, Maurizio Tamagnini, formerly a top investment banker at Merrill Lynch, was hired as the CEO of the fund. The position of chairman is filled by Giovanni Gorno Tempini, who was also the CEO of CDP, and is now its chairman of the board.

On 31 March 2016, Fondo Strategico Italiano was renamed into CDP Equity.

On 5 August 2016, Bank of Italy withdrew its 20% stake from CDP Equity.

Atlantia’s 88% share in motorway company Autostrade per l'Italia was bought in 2021 by a consortium of CDP Equity, Blackstone and Macquarie Group. CDP Equity holds 51% of the consortiums shares, while each other member holds 24,5%.

CDP Equity, together with other CDP Group subsidiaries signed a memorandum of understanding (MoU) with Khazanah Nasional in October 2023.

CDP Equity holds a majority of the shares in power generation equipment supplier Ansaldo Energia as well as in shipbuilding group Fincantieri.

== Investments ==
In May 2012, the Italian Strategic Fund stated that it would give financial backing to help fund a project that will bring fiber-optic cable to Italy's main cities, as part of the country's attempt to increase high-speed internet connectivity. The €4.5 billion project, led by fibre-optic company Metroweb (was a subsidiary of F2i First Fund via F2i Reti TLC) will receive an initial €200 million from Fondo Strategico Italiano through F2i Reti TLC. There is also an option for the fund to provide a further €300 million.

In May 2012, the Fondo Strategico Italiano acquired an 18.6% stake in biopharmaceutical company Kedrion S.p.A. from holding company Sestant S.p.A. for a total of €150 million. In addition, the Fondo Strategico Italiano has an option to acquire a majority stake in Kedrion from Sestant.

Also in May 2012, the defence and aerospace group Finmeccanica agreed to sell its 14% stake in aero-engine parts maker Avio to the Fondo Strategico Italiano. According to Finmeccanica, the deal is subject to Avio being listed on the Milan stock exchange before the end of 2012. In November 2012, Prime Minister Mario Monti, signed with the Government of Qatar a €2 billion development project; the main investor is Qatar Holding.

It was announced in March 2014, that the Fondo Strategico Italiano had made a non-binding offer for a 30% stake in the Spanish olive oil producer Deoleo.

In July 2016 Enel Open Fiber acquired Metroweb from F2i SGR and Cassa Depositi e Prestiti. However, CDP Equity also acquired 50% stake in Open Fiber. In 2021, CDP Equity and Macquarie bought the remaining 40% of Open Fiber not owned by the companies. CDP Equity raised its shares to 60% and Macquarie to 40%.

In March 2021 CDP Equity and Eni launched the joint venture Green IT to develop solar and wind energy project for the next five years with an Investment of $957 million. 49% of the company is owned by CDP Equity and 51% by ENI. In March 2023, Green IT and Copenhagen Infrastructure Partners began developing three floating wind projects off the coast of Italy. In April 2023, additional funds of €1.7 billion were agreed upon for GreenIT. The funds will be used for the development and construction of onshore and offshore plants as well as the re-powering of existing plants.

== Portfolio ==
CDP Equity portfolio mainly comprises minority stakes in private companies, in various key sectors of the Italian economy:

Cloud services

- Polo Strategico Nazionale (20%)

Constructions

- Saipem (12.8%)
- Trevi Finanziara Industriale (21.3%)
- Webuild (16.4%)

Digital agriculture

- Diagram (41.6%)

Digital healthcare

- GPI (18.4%)

Digital payments

- Nexi (19.1%)

Digital solutions and security

- Zenita (17.6%)

Energy

- GreenIT (49%)
- Renovit (30%)

Financial infrastructure

- Euronext (8.1%)

Healthcare

- Kedrion (6.6%)

Industrial

- Ansaldo Energia (99.6%, non-listed)
- Fincantieri (70.9%)
- Valvitalia (75%)

Infrastructure

- Autostrade per l'Italia (88.1%)

Telco infrastructure

- Open Fiber (60%)

Tourism

- Hotelturist (45.9%)

In addition to these companies, CDP Equity holds stakes in the asset management companies F2i (14%), Fondo Italiano d'Investimento (55%) and CDP Venture Capital SGR SpA (70%).
