= Renato Ravanelli =

Italian corporate manager (born 1965)

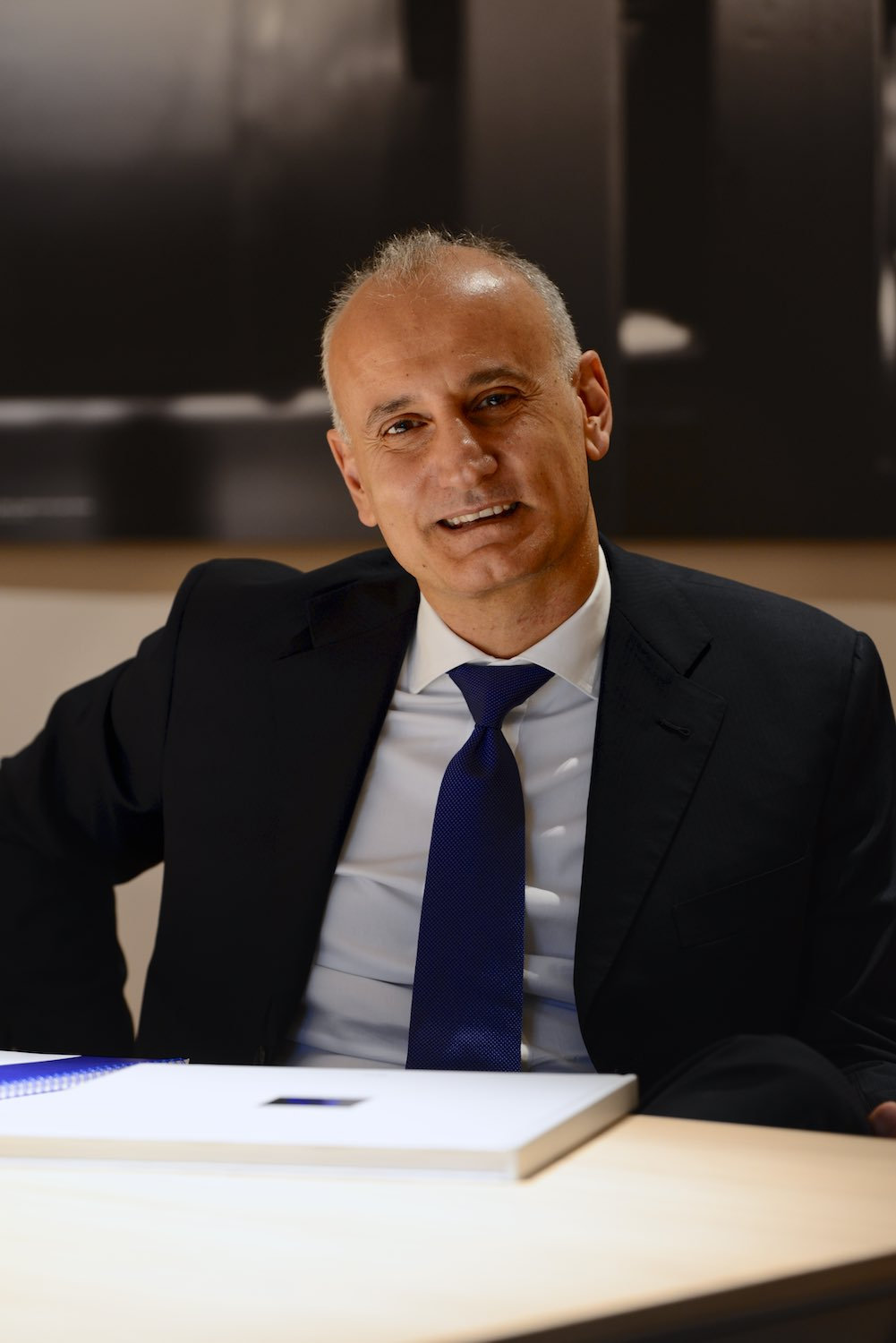
- Chief executive officer of F2i SGR
- Born: 1965 (age 60–61); Milan
- Occupation: manager

Renato Ravanelli (born in 1965) is an Italian corporate manager.

== Biography ==
=== Education and first professional experiences ===
Following his degree in business and economics, earned at the Università Cattolica del Sacro Cuore in Milan, Ravanelli's career began when focusing his university studies on insurances and the utilities sector, with a special interest in regulatory matters. After this first step, he spent four years working as a macroeconomist and financial analyst at two Italian financial institutions.

=== Responsibilities at AEM, Edison, A2A and F2i ===
He started his cooperation with the AEM group as head of electric power and gas trading and, soon after, as CFO and strategy director. During the 2005–2007 period, he joined Edison as CFO and executive member of the group's board of directors. From early 2008 to mid-2014 Ravanelli was general manager of the A2A Group – the main Italian multiutility company operating in the electric power and gas sectors, as well as in the environment and energy carrier networks. On October 22, 2014, Ravanelli succeeded Vito Gamberale as chief executive officer of Fondi Italiani per le Infrastrutture SGR – the most important Italian investment fund operating in the infrastructure sector. In 2010, he also became a member of Inframed's Investment Committee – a major infrastructure fund operating in the Mediterranean area. In an interview with Il Sole 24 Ore He announced the launch of a Third F2i Fund in 2017.
