= Metroweb Italia =

Italian telecommunications company

Metroweb Italia S.p.A.
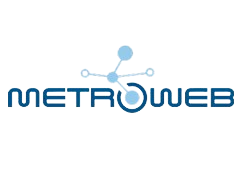
- Formerly: F2i Reti TLC S.p.A. (2011-2013)
- Type: Holding
- Industry: Telecommunications
- Founded: June 30, 2011; 15 years ago
- Founder: F2i; Fondo Strategico Italiano
- Defunct: January 13, 2017
- Fate: Merged into Enel Open Fiber
- Successor: Enel Open Fiber
- Headquarters: Milan, Italy
- Area served: Italy
- Products: Fiber-optic communications, FTTH
- Revenue: € 64,291,000 (2014)
- Net income: € 8,847,000 (2014)
- Owner: F2i (53.8%); FSI Investimenti (46.2%)
- Parent: F2i; Cassa Depositi e Prestiti
- Subsidiaries: Metroweb Milano (87.68%); Metroweb Genova (85%); Metroweb Sviluppo (100%); Metrobit (100%)
- Website: www.metrowebitalia.it

Metroweb Italia S.p.A. (formerly F2i Reti TLC S.p.A.) was a fiber-optic network operator based in Milan, Italy. It was the holding that controlled Metroweb Milano, Metroweb Genova, Metroweb Sviluppo and Metrobit.

Founded in 2011, Metroweb Italia was a joint venture between F2i (53.83%) and Cassa Depositi e Prestiti via FSI Investimenti (46.17%). It was known for its fiber-optic cabling and offered a wide range of dark fiber services to operators and companies of all kinds.

In 2017 it was merged into Enel Open Fiber.

== History ==
The company was founded on June 30, 2011. At founding, Intesa Sanpaolo was a minority shareholder of Metroweb Italia for 12.5% stake, but sold the shares to F2i for €20 million. After the transaction, FSI formally subscribed the capital increase of Metroweb Italia, to become the new minority shareholders.

In October 2012, Metroweb Italia acquired the controlling interests (85%) in Genoese company Saster Net, which was renamed to Metroweb Genova.

In April 2015 a takeover bid from Telecom Italia was rejected.

In June 2016, Enel entered into negotiations with CDP Equity and F2i, aiming at a future integration between Enel Open Fiber and Metroweb. The first step was the subscription of Open Fiber's capital increase, which led to the creation of a 50/50 joint venture between Enel and CDP Equity. Subsequently, on December 20, 2016, Enel Open Fiber acquired the entire capital of Metroweb, followed by the merger by incorporation of Metroweb into Open Fiber, approved by the Board of Directors on January 13, 2017 and completed in the first quarter of 2017.

== See also ==
- Enel Open Fiber
- Metroweb
