= Acea (company) =

Italian utility company

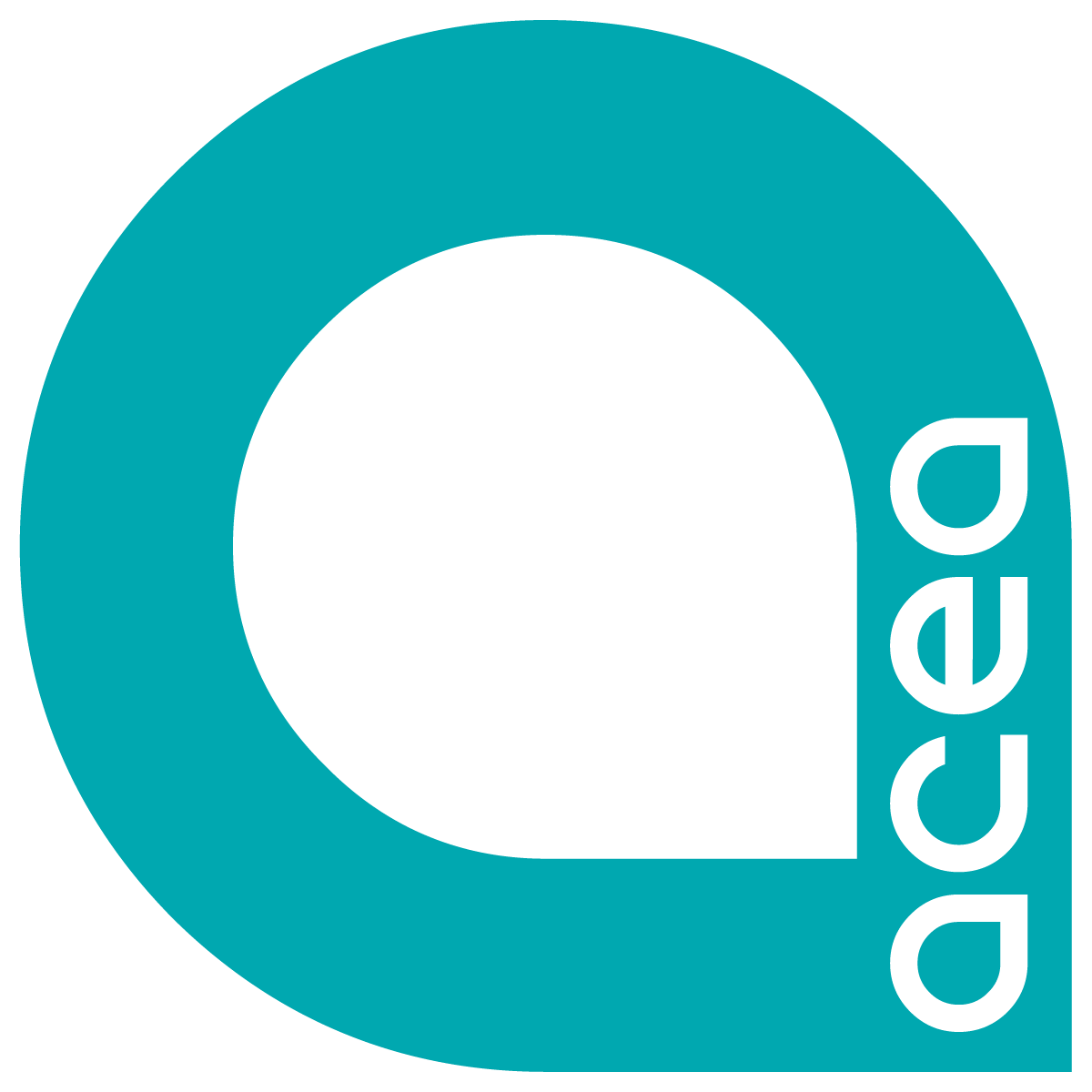

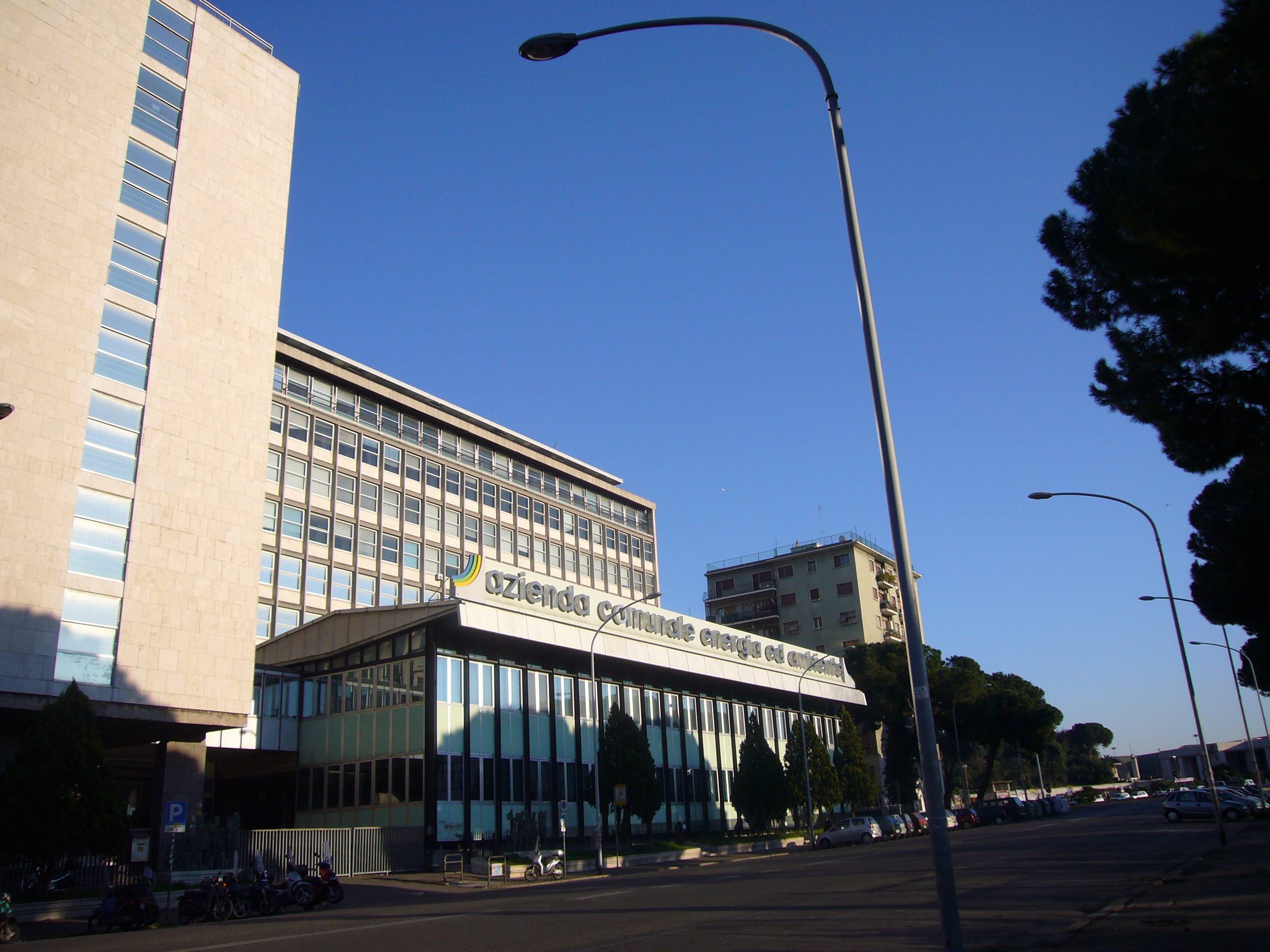
- Type: Società per azioni
- Traded as: FTSE Italia Mid Cap
- Industry: Utilities
- Founded: 1909; 117 years ago in Rome
- Headquarters: Rome, Italy
- Key people: Barbara Marinali (Chairperson); Fabrizio Palermo (CEO and GM)
- Revenue: €4,242 million (2025)
- Net income: €481 million (2025)
- Number of employees: 9,020 (2025)
- Website: www.acea.it/en

Acea Spa (originally an acronym for Azienda Comunale Elettricità e Acque—Electricity and Water Municipal Utility) is a multiutility operative in the management and development of networks and services in the water, energy and environmental sectors. Originally the city of Rome's provider, Acea is the main national operator in the water sector with a catchment area of about 10 million people, and manages integrated water services—aqueduct, sewerage and purification—that span the territories of Rome and Frosinone, as well as their respective provinces. Acea's activity is concentrated in Lazio, Liguria, Tuscany, Umbria, Campania, Abruzzo, Molise and Sicily, as well as in some Latin American countries including Honduras, Peru and the Dominican Republic.

Acea is listed on the Borsa Italiana and is part of the FTSE Italia Mid Cap index.

== History ==
Rome's Municipal Electric company, better known by its Italian acronym AEM (for "Azienda Elettrica Municipale"), was founded in 1909 to provide public and private street lighting. In 1912, AEM opened the Centrale Montemartini, its first thermoelectric power plant through which AEM started selling electricity in Rome.

In 1937, the governor of Rome entrusted the company with building and managing of aqueducts as well as the water distribution network for the city. With the newfound responsibilities, AEM changed its name to AGEA (an acronym for "Azienda Governatoriale Elettricità e Acque", Italian for "Government Electricity and Water Company") before changing it again to its current name Acea in 1945. At the end of World War II, the Centrale Montemartini was the only available power plant still operational because it coincidentally escaped the bombings.

In 1953, the Municipal Council of Rome approved Acea's plan for self-sufficiency in electricity with the aim of improving the city's water system. For the Rome Olympics in 1960, Acea also took responsibility for the city's public lighting systems.

In 1964, Acea gained control of Rome's entire water network on the expiry of the concession to Acqua Pia Antica Marcia for the management of the Marcio Aqueduct.

In 1976, Acea's plan for hydro-sanitary and street lighting refurbishment was approved within the framework of the redevelopment policy of Rome's suburbs launched by the Rome Municipality. In 1979, the Peschiera-Capore aqueduct system was completed, which continues to be Rome's main water source.

It was in 1985 that the company completed the management of the water cycle by taking on purification services.

In 1989, Acea changed its name from "Azienda Comunale Elettricità" (Municipal Electricity and Water Agency) to "Azienda Comunale dell'Energia e dell'Ambiente" (Municipal Agency of Energy and the Environment).

In the nineteen eighties and nineties, the Tor di Valle cogeneration plant began operation (in 1984, converted later to combined cycle from 1996) and the EUR water centre was inaugurated (1993).

In 1992, Acea became a Special Agency and, from 1 January 1998, a Joint Stock Company (Acea S.p.A.) which, with chief executive officer Paolo Cuccia at the helm, made its entrance on the Milan Stock Exchange on the 16th of July the following year.

In 2000, Acea entered the foreign market by constructing and conceding of a water plant in Lima (Peru).

In 2001, Acea acquired the Enel branch responsible for electricity distribution in the metropolitan area of Rome.

In the early 2000s, Acea took over the management of the integrated water service of ATO 3 Sarnese-Vesuviano in Campania, ATO 5 Lazio Meridionale-Frosinone and, for the Tuscan region, ATO 2 (Pisa), ATO 3 (Florence) and ATO 6 Grosseto-Siena through a group of subsidiary companies.

On 12 January 2018, Acea and Open Fiber stipulated an agreement for the development of an ultra-wide band communication network in Rome. In the same year, Acea entered the gas distribution sector.

On 10 July 2019, Acea, the Rome Municipality and the Lazio Region signed the renewal of the concession until 2031 for the management of the Peschiera aqueduct, an agreement made in light of the plan to double its size.

== Activities ==
Acea deals with: the integrated water service, production and distribution of electricity (including public and artistic lighting), the sale of energy and gas and waste treatment. These activities are divided into:

=== Water Italy ===
Acea is the leading operator in the water sector in Italy, serving 10 million inhabitants. In addition to managing the integrated water service of Rome and Frosinone, it operates in other areas of Lazio, Tuscany, Umbria, Campania and Molise.

=== Water (Overseas) ===
Acea also operates in Latin America, managing water operations in Honduras, the Dominican Republic and Peru, where it serves about 10 million inhabitants.

=== Environment ===
Acea is responsible for waste management with 1.6 million tons of waste managed every year.

With an eye on a circular economy, it manages composting plants like the one in Aprilia, the largest in Lazio, and the anaerobic digestion plant of Monterotondo Marittimo in Tuscany. In 2019, Acea entered the plastics treatment sector.

It also manages waste-to-energy plants in San Vittore and Terni.

=== Production ===
Acea is one of the leading Italian players in the energy generation from renewable sources, with over 1 TWh of energy produced.

It is particularly present in the photovoltaic sector with a power of 164.7 MW, in the thermoelectric sector with 106.8 MW and in the hydroelectric one with 124.2 MW.

=== Energy Management ===
Acea operates in several energy-related sectors, including energy efficiency, electric mobility, regulated market services, circular economy, and energy management.

The company coordinates its operating subsidiaries in activities related to the energy markets, centrally managing price and volume risks. Its activities include the trading of electricity, gas, and environmental certificates, improving internal energy efficiency through Aema S.r.l., and the sale of electricity in the regulated market through Servizio Elettrico Roma S.p.A.

=== Networks & Public Lighting ===
It supplies 10 TWh of electricity to Rome and the surrounding municipalities, managing its public and artistic lighting.

Acea is also working on projects regarding energy efficiency and smart grids.

=== Engineering & Infrastructure Projects ===
Acea designs, constructs and manages energy infrastructures and integrated water systems. It also provides laboratory services and engineering consultancy.

== Group structure ==
=== Water Italy ===
- Adistribuzionegas Srl: 51%
- A.Gas SpA: 100%
- Umbriadue Servizi Idrici Scarl: 45,5%
- Acque Blu Fiorentine SpA: 75%
- Acea Siracusa: 60%
- Iseco SpA: 80%
- Ombrone SpA: 99,5%
- GORI SpA: 36,7%
- a.Quantum Hospital Services SpA: 100%
- a.Quantum SpA: 100%
- Acea Ato 2 SpA: 96,5%
- Sarnese Vesuviano Srl: 99,2%
- Gesesa SpA: 57,9%
- Servizi Idrici Integrati Scarl: 19,6%
- Acea Ato 5 SpA: 98,5%
- Acea Molise Srl: 100%
- Acea Acqua SpA: 100%
- Acque Blu Arno Basso: 86,7%

=== Water Overseas ===
- Acea International SA: 100%
- Consorcio Agua Azul: 44%
- Consorcio Servicio Sur: 51%
- Acea Dominicana SA: 100%
- Consorcio Acea Lima Norte: 100%
- Consorcio Acea Lima Sur: 100%
- Aguas de San Pedro SA: 60,6%
- Acea Perù SAC: 100%
- Consorzio Acea – Acea Dominicana: 100%

=== Networks & Public Lighting ===
- areti SpA: 100%
- a.cities Srl:100%

=== Production ===
- Acea Liquidation and Litigation Srl: 100%
- SF Island Srl: 100%
- Acea Solar Srl: 100%
- Acea Produzione: 100%

=== Energy Management ===
- Servizio Elettrico Roma SpA: 100%
- Acea Energy Management: 100%
- Acea Energia SpA: 100%
- Umbria Energy SpA: 72,6%

=== Environment ===
- ASM Terni SpA: 45,3%
- Aquaser Srl: 92,8%
- Acea Ambiente SpA: 100%
- Orvieto Ambiente Srl: 89,1%
- A.S. Recycling Srl: 100%
- Cavallari Srl: 80%
- Deco SpA: 100%
- Demap Srl: 100%
- MEG Srl: 80%
- SER Plast Srl: 100%
- Consorzio Servizi Ecologici del Frentano “Ecofrentano”: 75%
- Ecologica Sangro SpA: 100%
- Ferrocart Srl: 27,2%
- Tecnoservizi Srl: 85%

=== Engineering & Infrastructure Projects ===
- Acea Infrastructure SpA: 100%
- Simam SpA: 100%[64]
- Technologies for Water Services SpA: 100%
- Ingegnerie Toscane: 44%

== Operations ==
- 8 Hydroelectric power plants
- 2 Thermoelectric power plants
- 2 Waste-to-energy plants
- 1 Plastics treatment plant
- over 250,000 lighting points for Rome public and artistic lighting

== Financial information ==
	2025	2024	2023	2022	2021	2020	2019	2018	2017	2016
Consolidated revenues (million €)	2,986	4,270	4,649	5,138	3,972	3,379	3,186	3,028	2,797	2,832
EBITDA (million €)	1,420	1,557	1,391	1,305	1,256	1,155	1,042	933	840	896
Net profit (million €)	481	332	294	280	313	285	284	271	181	262
Investments (million €)	1,531	1,439	993	1,001	931	907	793	631	532	531

== Board of directors ==
Board members in charge until the approval of the 2028 Annual Report:

- Alessandro Rivera - Chairperson
- Fabrizio Palermo - Chief Executive Officer and General Manager
- Barbara Marinali - Deputy Chairman
- Alessandro Caltagirone, Massimiliano Capece Minutolo Del Sasso, Antonino Cusimano, Susanna Maria Invernizzi, Elisabetta Maggini, Luisa Melara, Angelo Piazza, Ferruccio Resta, Patrizia Rutigliano, Nathalie Tocci - Non-executive directors

== Ownership structure ==
- Roma Capitale: 51.00%
- Suez SA: 23.33%
- Francesco Gaetano Caltagirone: 5.45%
- Market: 20.22%
