= Camera di commercio, industria, artigianato e agricoltura =

The Chamber of Commerce, Industry, Agriculture and Artisanship (Italian: Camera di Commercio, Industria, Agricoltura e Artigianato, CCIAA) is a group of Italian organizations that promote business activities. Companies are required to register in the chamber of the province in which they belong and to fill their annual financial accounts to Registro delle Imprese, a division of the chamber.

The chamber is also involved in direct investments in companies, such as Bologna Chamber of Commerce is the major shareholder of Aeroporto Guglielmo Marconi di Bologna, the operator of Bologna Airport, as well as Tecno Holding, a consortium that owned a minority stake in Società Azionaria Gestione Aeroporto Torino and Autostrade Lombarde.
