= Flibco =

Airport Shuttle services

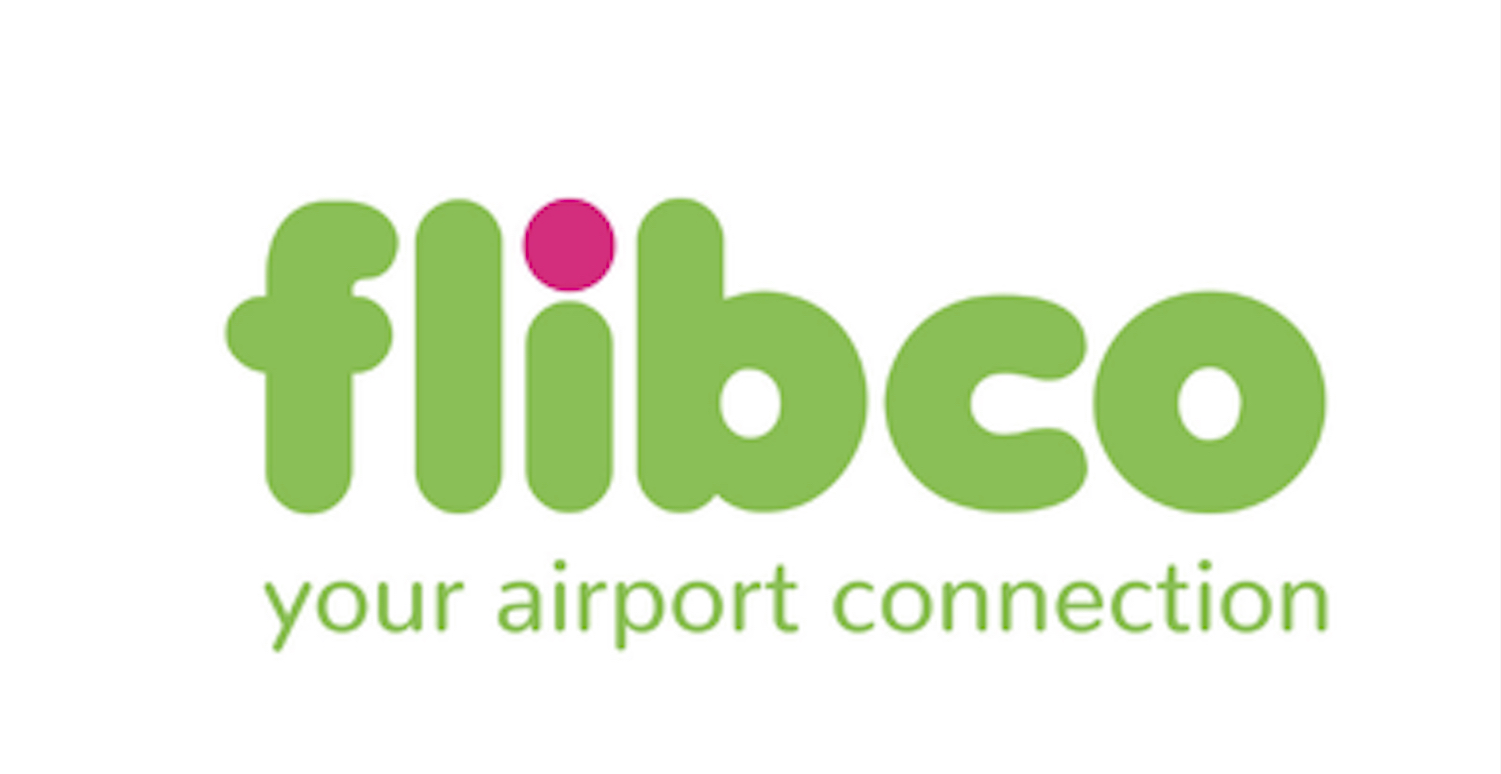

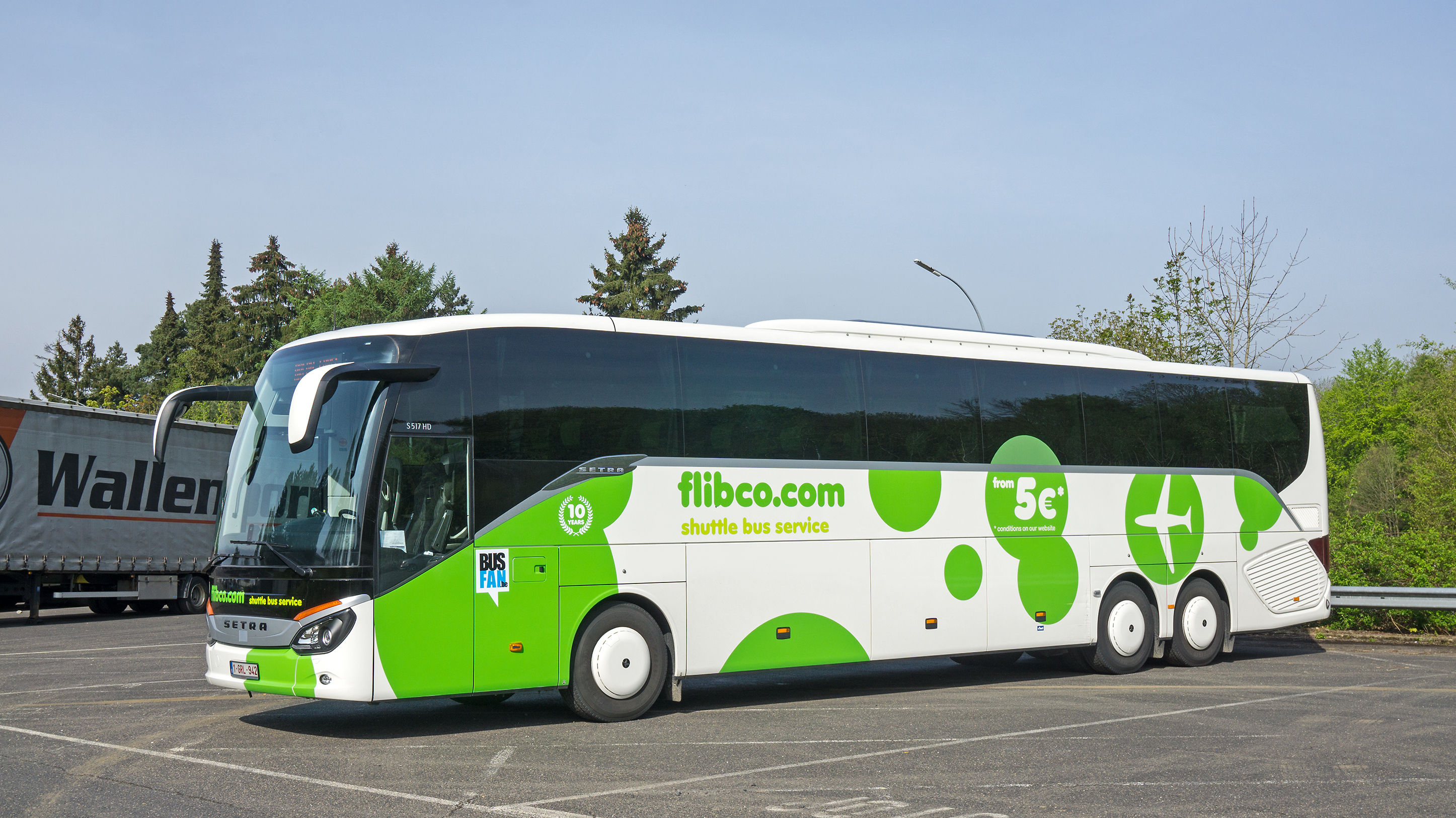
- Founded: 2005; 21 years ago
- Headquarters: Bascharage, Luxembourg
- Service area: Europe
- Service type: Transportation (using airport bus)
- Website: flibco.com

Flibco, also known as Flibco.com or Flibtravel International, is a Luxembourgish public transportation company that manages short-medium distance bus lines to airports especially in Europe. Flibco is part of Sales-Lentz Group (SLG). It is known in Germany, Belgium, Italy and the United Kingdom.

== History ==
The company in collaboration with local bus operators specializes in airport bus services.

In January 2026, it was announced that Flibco had been acquired by FlixBus, which took a majority share in the company for an undisclosed amount. As part of the transaction, Flibco’s existing owner SLG retained a minority stake, while the company continued to operate under its existing management.

=== Germany ===
The company started operating bus lines to Frankfurt–Hahn Airport around 2006, around the same time that low-cost airline Ryanair began operating at this remote airport.

=== Belgium ===
In Belgium, Flibco has launched lines to Brussels South Charleroi Airport, which is poorly served by local public transport with only TEC buses available. Initially, the service was only available from Brussels-South railway station, but later expanded to include connections from Bruges, Ghent, Arlon, Mons, Antwerp (BE), Breda, Tilburg (NL), Lille (FR), Luxembourg (LU). In 2019 it carried 25% of travelers at this airport.

=== Italy ===
Since 2019, Flibco has been present in the Italian market, establishing the company FlibTravel International Italy SRL with its headquarters in Milan. Currently, it carries out a connection service with coaches between the Milan Central station and the Orio al Serio airport, between Malpensa and Turin, the Turin Caselle airport and Turin, and between the city of Florence and Pisa airport.

=== United Kingdom ===
On 1 April 2025, Flibco began UK operations, providing a coach service between London Stansted Airport and London.
