= Metroweb =

Italian telecommunications company

Metroweb S.p.A.
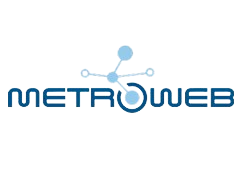
- Formerly: Citytel S.r.l. (1997-1999)
- Type: Subsidiary
- Industry: Telecommunications
- Founded: December 12, 1997; 28 years ago
- Founder: AEM
- Defunct: January 13, 2017
- Fate: Merged into Enel Open Fiber
- Successor: Enel Open Fiber
- Headquarters: Milan, Italy
- Area served: Italy
- Products: Fiber-optic communications, FTTH
- Revenue: € 64,291,000 (2014)
- Net income: € 8,847,000 (2014)
- Owner: Metroweb Italia (89.4%); Fastweb (10.6%)
- Parent: Metroweb Italia
- Website: www.metroweb.it

Metroweb S.p.A. (formerly Citytel S.r.l.), also known as Metroweb Milano, was a fiber-optic network operator based in Milan, Italy. It was a subsidiary of Metroweb Italia.

Founded in 1997, Metroweb was known for its fiber-optic cabling. Historically, it wired Milan, allowing Fastweb's FTTH services and a wide range of dark fiber to operators and companies of all kinds.

Operators use a GPON network by renting Metrobit "monofiber", a single fiber of the single-mode type that allows full-duplex at gigabit speeds.

In 2017 it was merged into Enel Open Fiber.

== History ==
The company was founded on December 12, 1997 as Citytel by AEM with an investment of 200 million lire to build and manage broadband telecommunications networks.

In 1999 e.Biscom (later Fastweb) acquired 33% of Citytel, which was sold again to AEM in 2003. In the same year the company became Metroweb.

In 2006, the Stirling Square Capital Partners fund and some of the company's managers acquired 76.5% of Metroweb from AEM, paying 232 million euros.

In 2011, the Stirling Square Capital Partners fund and A2A sold their shares (12.5% and 87.5% respectively) of Metroweb to the F2i and IMI Investimenti (Intesa Sanpaolo) for 436 million euros.

Since 2013, the FTTH offer on Metroweb infrastructure was extended to other operators such as Vodafone and Wind.

In June 2016, Enel entered into negotiations with CDP Equity and F2i, aiming at a future integration between Enel Open Fiber and Metroweb. The first step was the subscription of Open Fiber's capital increase, which led to the creation of a 50/50 joint venture between Enel and CDP Equity. Subsequently, on December 20, 2016, Enel Open Fiber acquired the entire capital of Metroweb, followed by the merger by incorporation of Metroweb into Open Fiber, approved by the Board of Directors on January 13, 2017 and completed in the first quarter of 2017.

== See also ==
- Enel Open Fiber
- Metroweb Italia
