= Ansaldo Energia =

Italian power company

Ansaldo Energia S.p.A.
- Type: Private
- Industry: Power Generation, Government Services
- Predecessor: Gio. Ansaldo & C.
- Founded: 1853
- Headquarters: Genoa, Italy
- Area served: Worldwide
- Key people: Carlo Alberto Giusti president; Fabrizio Fabbri CEO
- Products: Fossil and Nuclear Power Plants; Research and Development; Government Operations
- Revenue: €1.2 billion (2025)
- Net income: €20 million (2025)
- Owner: CDP Equity (99,6%)
- Number of employees: 4,500 (January 2020)
- Website: www.ansaldoenergia.com

Ansaldo Energia S.p.A. is an Italian joint-stock company operating in the energy sector and is among the world's leading producers of power plants. Originally a division of the Ansaldo group, it later became part of Leonardo (formerly Leonardo-Finmeccanica). In December 2013, Leonardo decided to sell part of its stake in Ansaldo Energia to the Italian Strategic Fund, and the transaction was completed at the end of 2017.

As of 2026, the company's share capital is held by CDP Equity (99.6%), the Italian state investor.

== History ==
Ansaldo Energia was officially founded in 1991 in Genoa, as a continuation and expansion of Ansaldo, a company originally established in 1853.

In 1994, Ansaldo Energia merged with Ansaldo GIE, a company that had adopted this name in 1989. Ansaldo GIE was formed through various acquisitions, including that of Gruppo Industrie Elettro Meccaniche per Impianti all'Estero, and became fully owned by Ansaldo in 1991.

In September 2006, Ansaldo Energia acquired the Dutch company Thomassen Turbine Systems (TTS) from Calpine European Finance LLC for €18.5 million. TTS specialized in maintenance services for gas turbines and operated globally, with facilities in the Netherlands and Abu Dhabi.

In 2009, Ansaldo Ricerche S.p.A. was merged into Ansaldo Energia. Ansaldo Ricerche had been part of the Ansaldo Group, later acquired by Finmeccanica, and its activities were absorbed into Ansaldo Energia.

On March 9, 2011, Ansaldo Energia Holding (55% owned by Leonardo-Finmeccanica and 45% by First Reserve Corporation) acquired 100% of Ansaldo Energia for a total of €1.07 billion. Additionally, Ansaldo Energia paid Leonardo-Finmeccanica €95 million for the rights to use the Ansaldo brand for the following 25 years.

In 2011, Ansaldo Fuel Cells, originally established in 2003 as a spin-off of Ansaldo Ricerche focused on fuel cell development, was integrated into Ansaldo Energia, reinforcing the group's commitment to innovative and sustainable energy solutions.

In December 2013, the Italian Strategic Fund acquired 85% of Ansaldo Energia from Leonardo-Finmeccanica and the First Reserve Fund for €777 million. The deal was signed by Italian Prime Minister Matteo Renzi and Defence Minister Roberta Pinotti.

On May 8, 2014, Shanghai Electric and the Italian Strategic Fund signed an agreement for Shanghai Electric to acquire a 40% stake in Ansaldo Energia for €400 million. The deal was signed in the presence of Prime Minister Matteo Renzi and Defence Minister Roberta Pinotti. Following the transaction, the ownership structure saw the Italian Strategic Fund holding approximately 60%, and Shanghai Electric holding 40%.

In July 2016, Ansaldo Energia began the construction of a new plant in the Cornigliano district of Genoa, dedicated to assembling next-generation gas turbines "inherited" from Alstom. Upon completion—scheduled for June 2017—the production, which had previously been based in Germany, would be relocated to Italy. This new production line involved technology acquired by the Ligurian company as part of General Electric's acquisition of Alstom. The European Commission approved the General Electric–Alstom merger on the condition that Alstom's gas turbine technology be transferred to a European competitor. Ansaldo Energia was selected to receive this strategic asset.

In October 2019, Giuseppe Zampini stepped down as CEO to become Chairman, and Giuseppe Marino (formerly with Ansaldo Breda and Hitachi Ltd) was appointed as the new CEO.

In 2020, the GT36 gas turbine was introduced in Genoa, setting a new benchmark as the most powerful and high-performance turbine ever engineered in Italy. Initially nicknamed "Monte Bianco" for its unmatched power, it represents a pinnacle of European excellence.

In February 2020, Ansaldo Energia unveiled its industrial plan for the 2020-2024 period, which included the potential sale—later finalized—of several subsidiaries, including PSM and Ansaldo Thomassen.

As of January 2021, the company is 88% owned by the Cassa Depositi e Prestiti Group and 12% by Shanghai Electric Corporation, collectively holding over 1 billion euros in financial debt. In the following months, the Chinese partner acquired 40% of the floating shares.

In 2021, the subsidiary Ansaldo Green Tech was founded, focusing on the transition to carbon-neutral generation technologies, currently led by CEO Vittorio Olcese. Starting in 2023, Daniela Gentile became the CEO of the subsidiary Ansaldo Nucleare.

On March 5, 2023, Fabrizio Fabbri was appointed as the new CEO, a role he officially assumed on April 1, 2023.

== Products and services ==
Ansaldo Energia is a producer of thermoelectric power plants, operating in international markets serving public and private power producers and industrial clients. The company provides plant engineering, manufacturing and service fields at installations for thermal electric and hydroelectric plants in over 90 countries. In 2007, their total revenue stood at over 979 million euros.

The production centre is located in the Genoa - Campi area and is split into three product lines: gas turbines, steam turbines and generators.

Ansaldo Energia manufactures gas turbines in the range from 70 to 538 MW with more than 140 units delivered for a total installed capacity of more than 23,000 MW. The gas turbine models manufactured are based on Siemens and former Alstom designs.

Both the European Union and United States approved a deal for General Electric (GE) to acquire various business units from Alstom by September 2015, subject to the divestiture of Alstom's GT26 and GT36 model gas turbine manufacturing and service businesses. As part of this deal, GE sold its GE7FA gas turbine aftermarket parts subsidiary business, Power Systems Mfg. LLC (PSM), to Ansaldo Energia.

Steam turbine production covers a range of applications, with power ratings in the 80 to 1200 MW range. Generator production comprises air, hydrogen and water-cooled models, designed to withstand over 50,000 MVA of generating capacity.

== Subsidiary companies ==
Ansaldo Nucleare S.p.A. manufacturer nuclear energy production equipment and related services: this encompasses promotion, sales, management, engineering, contracting, fabrication and site implementation.

Ansaldo Thomassen provides services for GE-type heavy-duty gas turbine systems, including service and repair. An office in Abu Dhabi was established. Ansaldo Thomassen also has an office in Rheden, Netherlands.

Ansaldo ESG AG is a Switzerland-based energy service group, established in 1998. AESG specializes in steam turbine maintenance, covering turbine rotor and turbine casing repairs, re-blading, generator rewinds and repairs and component production.

On 25 February 2016, Ansaldo acquired a portion of Alstom's R&D Gas Turbine projects based in Baden, Switzerland. This acquisition was due to the conditions imposed by the EU and US Department of Justice pertaining to the merger of GE and Alstom Power. Ansaldo Energia has suppliers in Balkans with Europa construction, located in Albania. The new production will concern technologies obtained by the Ligurian joint-stock company after the acquisition of Alstom by General Electric. The Brussels Antitrust Authority has permitted the operation to GE, provided that the technology in the gas turbines of the French company was sold to a European competitor. The choice then fell on Ansaldo Energia.

== See also ==
- List of Italian companies
