= Nathalie Tocci =

Italian political scientist

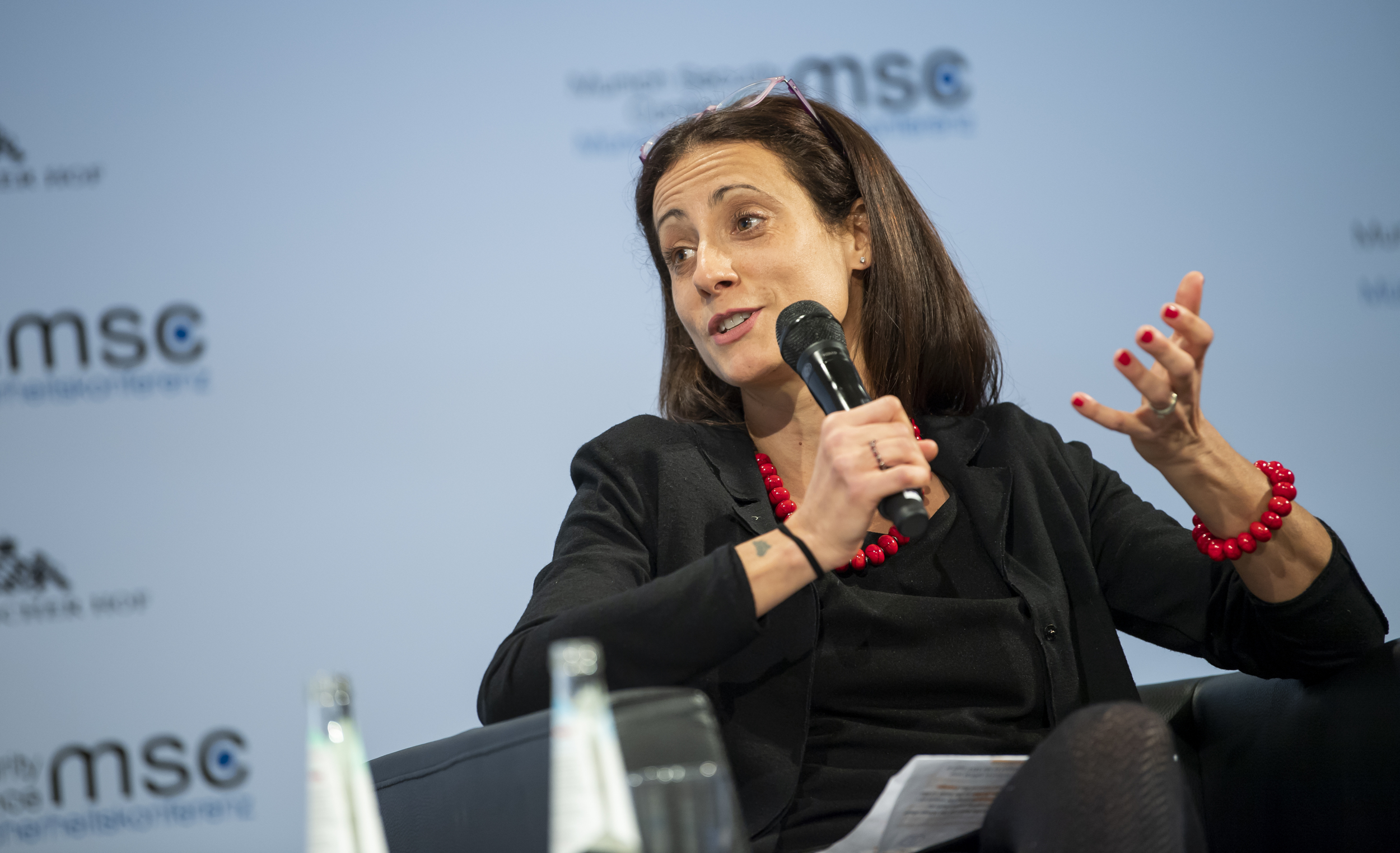
- Tocci at the Munich Security Conference in 2019
- Education: University College, Oxford; London School of Economics
- Awards: Anna Lindh Award on European Foreign Policy
- Scientific career
- Fields: Political science; International relations
- Workplaces: Centre for European Policy Studies; European University Institute; Istituto Affari Internazionali; Italian Ministry of Foreign Affairs

Nathalie Tocci is an Italian political scientist and international relations expert. She is currently a professor of practice at the Johns Hopkins School of Advanced International Studies, Europe, and a senior fellow at Bocconi University’s Institute for European Policymaking. She specialises in the role of the European Union (EU) in international affairs, and the relationship between European states. She has been the director of the Istituto Affari Internazionali, and has also worked as an adviser to the government of Italy and to EU officials on foreign policy issues.

== Early life and education ==
Tocci studied politics, philosophy, and economics at University College, Oxford, graduating with a BA degree in 1998. In 1999 she obtained an MSc degree from the London School of Economics, with a dissertation in Development Studies that focused on the political economy of Turkey. In 2003, Tocci completed a PhD in International Relations at the London School of Economics. The title of her dissertation is EU Accession Dynamics and Conflict Resolution: The Case of Cyprus 1988-2002.

== Career ==
=== Academic career ===
From 1999 to 2003, Tocci worked as a research fellow on EU relations at the Centre for European Policy Studies in Brussels. The following year she became a Jean Monnet Fellow at the Robert Schuman Centre for Advanced Studies in the European University Institute, where she continued to work until 2007. In 2006 she became a Senior Fellow at the Istituto Affari Internazionali, and in 2007 she returned for 2 years to the Centre for European Policy Studies. In 2010 Tocci became a department head at the Istituto Affari Internazionali, in 2011 she became deputy director there, and in 2017 she became the director. She also served as the associate editor of the journal The International Spectator.

In 2014, Tocci worked as an adviser to Federica Mogherini at the Italian Ministry of Foreign Affairs. Tocci continued to advise Mogherini on foreign policy issues when Mogherini served as EU's foreign policy chief in her capacity as the High Representative of the Union for Foreign Affairs and Security Policy and Vice-President of the European Commission, during the period 2015–2019. She then became an advisor to Josep Borrell when he succeeded Federica Mogherini in those roles.

Tocci has published several books on international relations with a particular focus on European affairs. In 2007, she published The EU and Conflict Resolution: Promoting Peace in the Backyard, in which she used the case of five ethno-religious conflicts on or around the borders of Europe to study the effectiveness of the EU's foreign policy in the area of making or maintaining peace. In 2011, Tocci published a book on America's role in mediating the relationship between Turkey and the EU, called Turkey's European Future: Behind the Scenes of America's Influence on EU-Turkey Relations. She also wrote Framing the EU's Global Strategy in 2017.

In 2008, Tocci received the Anna Lindh Award on European Foreign Policy. In 2015, she became an honorary professor at the University of Tübingen.

=== Opinion articles ===
Tocci is a frequent media commentator and is often interviewed by international television and newspaper journalists. She has also developed a presence writing opinion articles on European affairs for political magazines and newspapers. From 2018 to 2025 Tocci has been a regular columnist on global issues for Politico. Since 2023, she has been a Guardian Europe columnist on European political affairs. She is a regular panellist on the BBC News channel The Context current affairs programme.

In March 2026, she wrote in The Guardian that the initial failure of European leaders to respond to the "illegal US-Israeli war on Iran" in a coherent manner, noting they "foolishly fell for Trump's illusion", would lead them to stronger opposition and remind them that the erosion of international law is bad for the world including Europe.

In July 2026, she wrote an invited The Economist article exploring the unwillingness of the western European population to fight to defend Ukraine, and the possibility of deploying European forces before a ceasefire to develop a popular mindset that would better prepare the population for war.

=== Corporate boards ===
- Acea, Non-Executive Independent Director
- Eni, Non-Executive Independent Member of the Board of Directors (since 2020)
- Edison, Non-Executive Independent Member of the Board of Directors (2013–2020)

=== Non-profit organizations ===
- Centre for European Reform (CER), Member of the Advisory Board
- Círculo de Empresarios, Member of the Advisory Board
- European Policy Centre (EPC), Member of the Governing Council (since 2021)
- European Council on Foreign Relations (ECFR), Member
- Fondation pour la recherche stratégique (FRS), Member of the Scientific Advisory Board
- Institute for Integrated Transitions (IFIT), Member of the International Advisory Council
- Dahrendorf Forum, Member of the Committee

=== Editorial boards ===
- Journal of European Integration, Member of the Editorial Board

== Selected works ==
- EU Accession Dynamics and Conflict Resolution: Catalysing Peace Or Consolidating Partition in Cyprus? (2004, Ashgate Publishing)
- The EU and Conflict Resolution: Promoting Peace in the Backyard (2007, Routledge)
- Turkey's European Future: Behind the Scenes of America's Influence on EU-Turkey Relations (2011, New York University Press)
- Framing the EU's Global Strategy (2017, Palgrave Macmillan)
- A Green and Global Europe (2022, Wiley)

== Selected awards ==
- Anna Lindh Award on European Foreign Policy (2008)
