= Arachidonyl-2'-chloroethylamide =

Names
- Preferred IUPAC name (5Z,8Z,11Z,14Z)-N-(2-Chloroethyl)icosa-5,8,11,14-tetraenamide
- Other names Arachidonyl-2'-chloroethylamide; ACEA

Identifiers
CAS Number	220556-69-4
3D model (JSmol)	Interactive image
ChEBI	CHEBI:191854
ChEMBL	ChEMBL151167
ChemSpider	4470547
IUPHAR/BPS	738
PubChem CID	5311006
CompTox Dashboard (EPA)	DTXSID60274346
- InChI: InChI=1S/C22H36ClNO/c1-2-3-4-5-6-7-8-9-10-11-12-13-14-15-16-17-18-19-22(25)24-21-20-23/h6-7,9-10,12-13,15-16H,2-5,8,11,14,17-21H2,1H3,(H,24,25)/b7-6-,10-9-,13-12-,16-15- Key: SCJNCDSAIRBRIA-DOFZRALJSA-N; InChI=1/C22H36ClNO/c1-2-3-4-5-6-7-8-9-10-11-12-13-14-15-16-17-18-19-22(25)24-21-20-23/h6-7,9-10,12-13,15-16H,2-5,8,11,14,17-21H2,1H3,(H,24,25)/b7-6-,10-9-,13-12-,16-15- Key: SCJNCDSAIRBRIA-DOFZRALJBU
- SMILES: ClCCNC(=O)CCC\C=C/C\C=C/C\C=C/C\C=C/CCCCC

Properties
Chemical formula	C_{22}H_{36}ClNO
Molar mass	365.99 g·mol^{−1}
Solubility in other solvents	soluble in ethanol, chloroform, THF and DMSO
- Except where otherwise noted, data are given for materials in their standard state (at 25 °C [77 °F], 100 kPa). (what is ?) Infobox references

Arachidonyl-2'-chloroethylamide (ACEA) is a synthetic agonist of the CB_{1} (CB1R). ACEA is considered to be a selective cannabinoid agonist as it binds primarily to the CB1R and has low affinity to the CB_{2} (CB2R) (K_{i} = 1.4 nM for CB1R; K_{i} = 3100 nM for CB2R).
