= Acea =

Acea is a surname. Notable people with the surname include:

- Eusebio Acea (born 1969), Cuban rower
- John Adriano Acea (1917–1963), American jazz pianist
- Raidel Acea (born 1990), Cuban sprinter and middle-distance runner

== See also ==
- ACEA (disambiguation)
