= Open Fiber =

Italian wholesale only telecommunications company

Open Fiber S.p.A.
- Formerly: Enel Open Fiber S.p.A. (2015-2017)
- Type: Subsidiary
- Industry: Telecommunications
- Predecessor: Metroweb
- Founded: December 2015; 10 years ago
- Founder: Enel
- Headquarters: Milan and Rome, Italy
- Area served: Italy
- Key people: Barbara Marinali (Chairperson); Giuseppe Gola (CEO)
- Products: Access network, core network, fiber-optic communications, telecommunications network, FTTH
- Revenue: ▲€186 million (2019)
- Net income: ▼€−116.9 million (2019)
- Owners: CDP Equity (60%); Macquarie Asset Management (40%)
- Parent: Cassa Depositi e Prestiti; Macquarie Group
- Website: www.openfiber.it

Open Fiber S.p.A. (formerly Enel Open Fiber S.p.A.) is an Italian wholesale only telecommunications company, owned 60% by CDP Equity S.p.A. (part of the Cassa Depositi e Prestiti S.p.A. group) and 40% by Macquarie Asset Management (part of the Macquarie Group Limited).

== History ==
Enel Open Fiber was established in December 2015, as a wholly owned subsidiary of Italian energy company Enel, in order to build an independent fibre-based access network.

In July 2016, the company acquired Metroweb from F2i SGR and Cassa Depositi e Prestiti, a private equity fund and a sovereign wealth fund respectively. However, CDP also acquired 50% stake in Open Fiber.

The company operates in the so-called "market success" clusters A and B as resolved by the Council of Ministers of the Italian Republic on 4 March 2015, i.e. 282 municipalities in large urban areas by 2022. The areas chosen for the project are a subset of the 642 municipalities categorized as clusters A and B by the Government. Open Fiber, estimating a cost corresponding to less than half of that proposed by the competition, won all fourteen lots envisaged in the three calls for the "ultra-broadband plan" launched by Infratel Italia for the construction of the network in clusters C and D i.e. "white areas" with low population density. The plan provides for the implementation of FTTH optical fiber with speeds up to 1 Gbit/s for urban areas and agglomerations of housing units, while preparing FWA radio links for rural or impervious areas and scattered houses.

In March 2020 Open Fiber had accrued penalties for late deliveries of the works amounting to 286,871,750 euros. Their value abundantly exceeded 10% of the amount of the works, a critical threshold which, according to the concession, gave the grantor the right to terminate the contract.

In 2022 Enel sells its 50% share, which is acquired for 40% by Macquarie Asset Management and for 10% by CDP Equity, which reaches a 60% stake in the company.

At the end of 2022, the debt reached a record value of 4.6 billion euros.

As of February 2023, optical fiber was carried out to 128,518 customers for a declared total cost for the Italian State of 1,471,810,248 euro (11,452 euro for each person). The service is available solely in 2,463,374 immobiliar units in respect of the 6,411,150 that had been planned for June 2023. Broadband diffusion can be verified in real time through a geographical search engine and an interactive map.

In 2023, Open Fiber reported significant growth. Revenues increased by 24 percent, from approximately €470 million in 2022 to €582 million. EBITDA rose by 31 percent, from around €179 million in 2022 to more than €234 million, with the margin increasing to 40 percent from 38 percent in the previous year. Nevertheless, due to higher financial charges, the company recorded a net loss of €296 million compared with a loss of €162 million in 2022.

In the same year, Open Fiber requested an additional €400 million in liquidity from its shareholders in order to stabilize its accounts, and asked the Ministry of the Treasury for €300 million in compensation for extra costs linked to the COVID-19 pandemic and to inflation associated with the Russian–Ukrainian war.

In April 2023, following a meeting of the interministerial committee on broadband chaired by Undersecretary for Innovation Alessio Butti, it emerged that Infratel data were calculated by sampling 25 percent of construction sites and that the figures confused two distinct units of measurement, namely street numbers and housing units covered. By May 2023, 2.6 million households had been covered, compared with the 6.4 million initially planned.

On 22 July 2023, Cassa Depositi e Prestiti (CDP), the majority shareholder of Open Fiber, asked the Meloni government to provide support to the company, requesting €600 million in additional funding. The requests were presented as covering unexpected costs.

Member of Parliament Maurizio Gasparri submitted a parliamentary question calling for the suspension of financing, the appointment of a commissioner to run the company, and the establishment of a parliamentary inquiry.

In September 2023, CDP dismissed Mario Rossetti from his position as chief executive officer. Gasparri proposed that Open Fiber's 1,400 employees and assets should be absorbed into Telecom Italia's NetCo. After Rossetti's departure, the roles of chief executive officer and general manager were assigned to Giuseppe Gola. In May 2025, Enrico Tommaso Cucchiani was appointed chairman of the company.

In March 2024, Open Fiber received the Operator Award 2024 from the FTTH Council Europe for its contribution to the development of fiber optic infrastructure in Europe.

In December 2024, Open Fiber launched a recapitalization with a capital increase of €1.5 billion. The main shareholders, Cassa Depositi e Prestiti (CDP) and Macquarie, contributed €630 million and €420 million respectively. This recapitalization was crucial for securing an additional financing package of nearly €1.3 billion from a consortium of 32 banks, with maturity in 2029. At the same time, as part of the 2025 Budget Law, an amendment was introduced reducing by 150,000 the number of street addresses to be covered in grey areas, 90,000 of which were allocated to Open Fiber. The change was calculated as the difference between what was set out in the tenders and what was agreed with the European Union.

== Shareholding ==
At its foundation, Enel Open Fiber S.p.A. was wholly owned by Enel S.p.A..

In 2017, CDP Equity S.p.A. (a company belonging to Cassa Depositi e Prestiti S.p.A.) acquired a 50 percent stake from Enel S.p.A., leading to the company's name being changed from Enel Open Fiber S.p.A. to Open Fiber S.p.A.

In 2022, Enel S.p.A. sold its 50 percent stake, of which 40 percent was acquired by Macquarie Asset Management Pty Limited and 10 percent by CDP Equity S.p.A., increasing the latter's holding to 60 percent.

== See also ==
- Cassa Depositi e Prestiti
- CDP Equity
- Enel
- Macquarie Group
- Metroweb
