= Vito Gamberale =

Italian manager

Vito Alfonso Gamberale
- Born: 3 August 1944 (age 81); Castelguidone, native from Agnone
- Occupation: manager

Vito Gamberale (born 1944) is an Italian manager.

== Early life and education ==
In 1968 he obtained his master's degree in mechanical engineering at La Sapienza University in Rome, and started working as assistant professor at the mechanical Engineering department. From 1968 to 1969 he worked at Azienda Nazionale Idrogenazione Combustibili (Eni group's society) in Milan; later he became the Istituto Mobiliare Italiano (IMI)'s evaluation expert in textile, clothing, iron and steel, and mechanical industries, until 1977.

He worked in GEPI SpA (a state-owned group), as acquisitions and privatizations manager, until 1984. Later, he held top offices in companies controlled by the Eni group and he settled the textile industry privatization (Lanerossi and Marzotto). In 1991 he left the company to work at the STET group, and held a primary role in telecommunication companies as CEO. In 1995 he established Telecom Italia Mobile SpA leading Italy to reach the highest mobile phone penetration rate worldwide.

His daughter, Chiara Gamberale – a well-known writer and anchor woman – (then only seventeen) drew on that event to write her first novel, Una vita sottile (Marsilio, 1999), turned into a fiction for the RAI.

== Career ==
In 1997, the company privatization and the new share structure got him to resign from general director of Telecom Italia. In 1998 Vito Gamberale joined the Benetton Group with the aim of taking part in the Autostrade privatization. He became vicepresident of 21 Investimenti SpA, an industrial participation company controlled by Benetton, Banca Intesa, Deutsche Bank and Assicurazioni Generali. In 2000, he became CEO of Autostrade SpA, European leader among motorways construction and management concessionaires; under his management, the group EBITDA grew from 1 to 2 billion euro. When the property announced a merger project with the Abertis Spanish company, he did not agree and resigned (2006).

Gamberale had a quick experience as Italian Football Federation (FIGC) deputy commissioner while Guido Rossi was commissioner and general manager. After that, he worked to create F2i SGR (Italian Funds for Infrastructures asset management company - Fondi Italiani per le Infrastrutture SGR), a company that would manage close-end investment fund dedicated to long-term investments (maximum 15 years) in the infrastructure sector. In 2007 he received the laurea honoris causa in Telecommunication Engineering. He was a promoter and Chairman of Amici della Speranza, a non-profit association supporting the haematology division of the San Giovanni Hospital in Rome, which was then merged to RomAil, an organisation where Gamberale has been a member of the Board until his resignation in February 2021.

On October 21, 2014, Gamberale resigned as CEO of F2i SGR.

From July 2015 to September 2018, he was Chairman of Quercus Assets Selection, a fund specialized in utility-scale renewable Energy infrastructure investments.

In June 2015, he entered the share capital and was appointed Chairman of Iterchimica, an Italian company which operates in over 70 countries, producing and distributing products for the enhancement of asphalt performance and the laying of road surfaces.

In February 2020, he founded and became Chairman of ITEЯ Capital Partners.
