= F2i =

F2i SGR S.p.A.

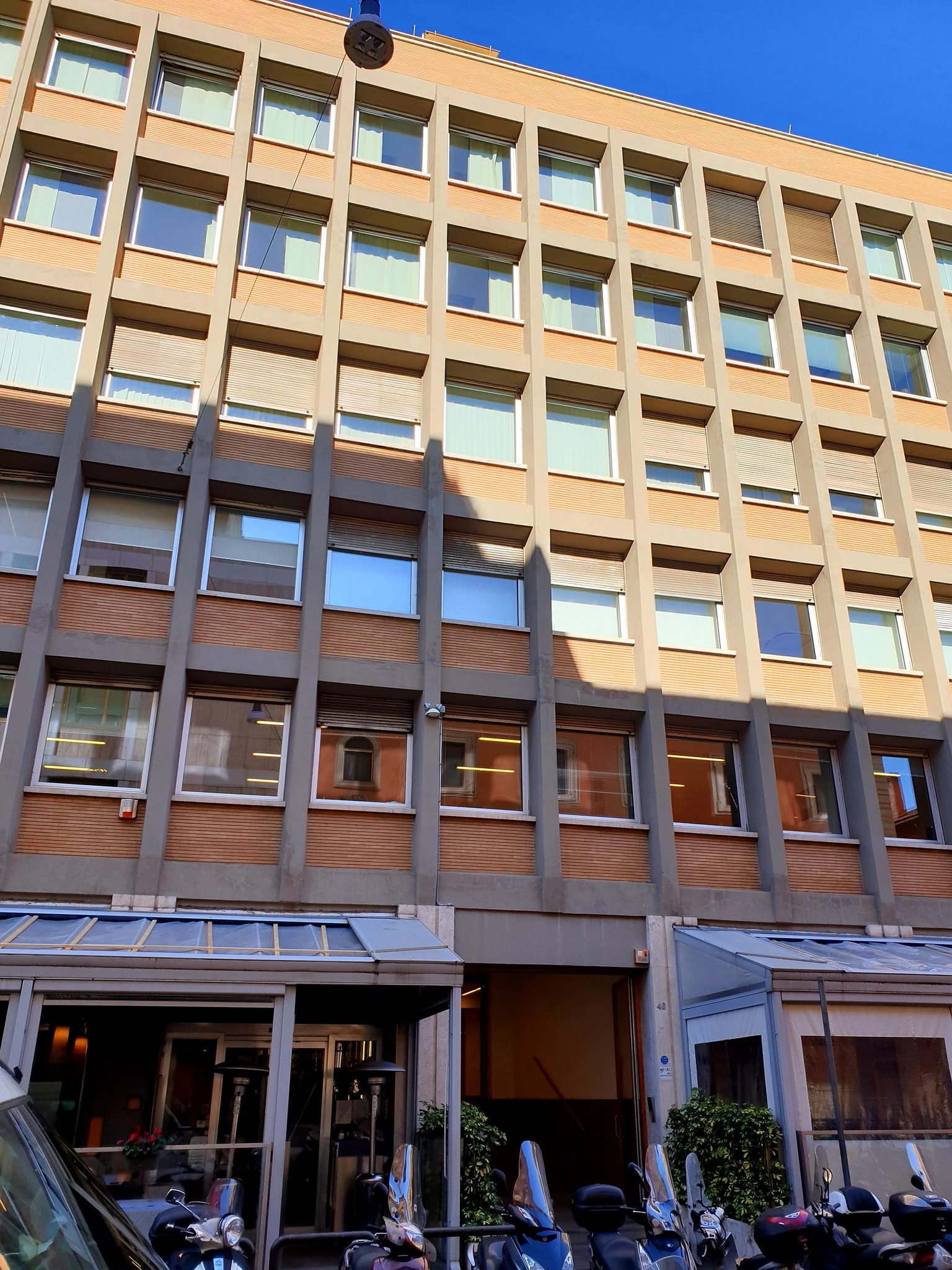
- F2i's headquarters in Rome
- Native name: F2i Fondi Italiani per le Infrastrutture Società di Gestione del Risparmio S.p.A.
- Type: Private
- Industry: Financial
- Founded: January 23, 2007; 19 years ago
- Founder: Cassa Depositi e Prestiti; UniCredit; Intesa Sanpaolo
- Headquarters: Milan and Rome, Italy
- Area served: Italy
- Key people: Renato Ravanelli (CEO); Massimiliano Cesare (Chairman)
- Services: Financial services
- AUM: € 7,000,000,000
- Number of employees: 22,000 (through its subsidiaries 2021)
- Website: www.f2isgr.it/en/

F2i Fondi Italiani per le Infrastrutture Società di Gestione del Risparmio S.p.A., commonly known as F2i, is Italy's largest independent infrastructure fund manager, with assets under management of approximately €7 billion. It currently manages five funds and one infrastructure Debt Fund.

== History ==
F2i SGR was established on 23 January 2007.

In May 2008 F2i finalized its first acquisition, by purchasing a 15.7% in Alerion Clean Power S.p.A. (the share will then be sold in December 2017).

After this, it acquired stakes in Enel Stoccaggi from Enel (49%) (the share will then be sold in February 2012) and Infrastrutture CIS (26%).

In 2009 F2i closes the collection of the First Fund, which comes to an endowment of 1.85 billion euros and became a shareholder of HFV (49.8%), Interporto Rivalta Scrivia (22.7%) and Enel Rete Gas (80%), through F2i Reti Italia S.r.l., for overall shareholdings of €550 million.

In July 2010, through F2i Rete Idrica Italiana S.p.A., it took over a 24% stake in San Giacomo S.r.l., the majority shareholder of IREN Acqua, for the establishment of a pole that would invest in water networks by exploiting the liberalisation of the sector: Iren held the remaining shares. The stake reached 40% in the months after.

In October 2010, F2i acquired a 65% stake in GESAC for €150 million (via 2i Aeroporti) - GESAC being the handling company that controls Naples-Capodichino Airport - and a 54% stake in Software Design, a company specialised in airport software. In October 2017, F2i will increase its stake in GESAC to 87%.

In December 2010, alongside Finavias S.r.l. (AXA group) F2i invested €255 million for a 100% stake in E.ON Rete, a company belonging to the E.ON group, that is active in natural gas distribution in Italy with circa 600,000 clients in 300 Municipalities and a grid which extends for 9,100 kilometres. After this operation, F2i gained control of 50,000 kilometres of grid, over 2.7 million clients and a 15.8% market share.

In May 2011, a consortium made up of F2i (87.5%) and Intesa Sanpaolo (12.5%) took over 100% stake in Metroweb, a telecommunications company that controls a 330,000-kilometre-long optical fibre network covering an area of over 2.7 million inhabitants, mainly in the Municipality of Milan and partially in the rest of Lombardy. In September 2012 Intesa Sanpaolo sold the 12.5% stake to F2i for €20 million.

On 6 June 2011, alongside AXA, F2i acquired a 100% stake in G6 Rete Gas (owned by GDF Suez) for €772 million; G6 Rete Gas is active in methane gas distribution with 990,000 clients and 4 billion cubic metres of methane delivered through 13,000 kilometres of pipes. After this operation, F2i gained control of more than 18-20% of the gas distribution market.

On 29 December 2011 it completed the acquisition of 29.75% of SEA, the management company of Milan Malpensa and Linate airports, and indirectly became a shareholder of SACBO, the management company of Bergamo Orio al Serio Airport.

At the end of 2012 F2i acquired a further 14.52% stake in SEA and invested in SAGAT, the management company of Turin Caselle Airport.

In 2013 F2i became a minority shareholder in Aeroporto di Bologna S.p.A., the airport management company of the airport with the same name.

On 21 October 2014, Vito Gamberale resigned as CEO at F2i. On the same day, F2i's Board of Directors co-opted and subsequently appointed Renato Ravanelli Chief Executive Officer and Carlo Michelini, former Senior Partner and Chief Investment Officer, General Manager of F2i.

In 2015 49% shares of 2i Aeroporti was sold to a consortium formed by Ardian and Crédit Agricole Assurances (a Crédit Agricole subsidiary).

In October 2015, F2i and Enel Green Power signed an agreement to create an equal joint venture in the photovoltaic segment which gave birth to EF Solare Italia, which in November 2016 became the national leader in the photovoltaic sector. In December 2018, F2i became the sole shareholder of the company, acquiring the 50% stake previously owned by the Enel Group.

In March 2016, a consortium led by F2i acquired, through F2i Healthcare, 37.3% of KOS, one of the main players in the Italian long-term care sector.

In December 2016 acquired 72.5% of So.Ge.A.Al (Alghero Airport).

In 2017, F2i acquired, through 2i Fiber (80% F2i and 20% Marguerite), Infracom, Mc-Link and KPNQWEST Italia, aiming to integrate them into a single platform: in 2018 the acquired companies merge into a newco, IRIDEOS. Irideos will be sold to the Asterion fund in December 2022.

In November 2017, Massimiliano Cesare succeeded Leone Pattofatto as president.

Towards the end of 2017, F2i entered the vegetable biomass power generation sector acquiring 100% of Sanmarco Bioenergie.

In 2018, thanks to the acquisition of the entire vegetable biomass plant portfolio from the Enel Group, F2i became one of the main players in the renewables sector and a leader in Italy.

In July 2018, F2i acquires RTR, a European leader in the production of renewable energies by solar plants with 134 plants in Italy for a total capacity of 334 MWp.

In October 2018, F2i gave birth to the first independent operator of telecommunication towers, after a successful OPA on EI Towers launched in 2017 through 2i Towers (60% F2i and 40% Mediaset).

In November 2018, through Farmacie Italiane (61.2% owned by F2i Third Fund), F2i completed the take over of Gruppo Farmacrimi.

In December 2018, it acquired full control of EF Solare.

In June 2019, F2i and EI Towers acquired Italian broadcaster Persidera.

In July 2019, through 2i Aeroporti (51% owned by F2i), F2i acquired 55% of Trieste Airport – Aeroporto Friuli Venezia Giulia.

In August 2019 F2i created F2i Holding Portuale, the infrastructure fund's port group.

Early November 2019 F2i divested its assets in Software Design and SIA.

In December 2019, through EF Solare, F2i acquired Spanish solar energy company Renovalia, raising its operational renewable energy portfolio to 1GW and becoming European leader of the sector.

In April 2020 F2i announced its first investment through the Ania F2i Fund, acquiring a 92.5% stake in CFI – Compagnia Ferroviaria Italiana, Italy's third largest freight operator.

In August 2020 F2i presented its First Integrated Sustainability Report.

In October 2020, F2i SGR, together with Asterion Industrial Partners, completed the acquisition of Sorgenia, thus creating an integrated provider of energy transition technologies, with an installed capacity of around 4,800 Megawatts.

On 23 October 2020 F2i signed an agreement to acquire 80% of Geasar S.p.A., the Olbia Costa Smeralda Airport management company, from Alisarda S.p.A.

At the beginning of 2021 F2i signed an agreement for the sale to Crédit Agricole Assurances of a 30% stake in EF Solare Italia, keeping the remaining 70%.

It also signed an agreement with Edison for the sale of its stake (70%) in E2i Energie Speciali.

In February 2021, F2i completed the acquisition of 80 per cent of Geasar SpA, the management company of Olbia Costa Smeralda Airport, by F2i Ligantia, thus creating - with Alghero - the North Sardinia Airport Hub.

In May 2021, F2i announced the launch of the Sustainable Infrastructure Fund (Fifth Fund), which marks F2i's entry into new areas of focus in its investment strategy with a focus on: energy transition, circular economy, digitalisation and social and health infrastructure. With this transaction, F2i exceeds EUR 6 billion in assets under management.

F2i Holding Port in July 2021 acquires CMP, the terminal operator of the port of Monfalcone. The acquisition, to be carried out by FHP, which is controlled by the F2i Third Fund (42%) and the F2i-ANIA Fund (58%), consolidates its leadership in the bulk cargo port sector.

In August 2021, F2i - through its Sustainable Infrastructure Fund - acquired 70% of ReLIfe, the largest private operator active in the reuse and energy recovery of paper and plastic packaging.

In the same month, the Group announced the acquisition of Ital Gas Storage, operating in the natural gas storage business, with an initial 51% sale, enriching its portfolio with a further strategic infrastructure for the energy transition.

In March 2022, F2i announced that it had participated - through 2i Aeroporti - in the capital increase of Skyports, a leading global operator in the design and management of Vertiports and drone delivery and inspection services.

In May 2022, the Fund reached an agreement to acquire Althea Group Spa, a leading Italian private operator in the integrated management of biomedical infrastructure. The acquisition of Althea is the third investment made in just a few months by F2i on behalf of the Fund for Sustainable Infrastructure.

In August 2022, F2i exceeded EUR 7 billion in funding through the launch of its first Infrastructure Debt fund with a target amount of EUR 500 million.

In October 2022, the third Integrated Sustainability Report is presented, highlighting the progress made in environmental, economic and social performance, not only by F2i sgr, but also by its portfolio companies.

F2i sgr's first Infrastructure Debt Fund launched two sustainable investment activities in December 2022.

In March 2023, Nord Sardegna Aeroporti was established, a single management company for the two airports in northern Sardinia, bringing together the management companies of Olbia Costa Smeralda Airport (GEASAR SpA) and Alghero Fertilia Riviera del Corallo Airport (SOGEAAL SpA).

In July 2023, IDF1 surpassed the EUR 200 million investment threshold by signing three new financing transactions in strategic sectors, again with a focus on sustainability.

In the following month, August 2023, IDF1 carried out a further financing transaction in the same strategic sector to support Veritas Spa's circular economy and water network improvement projects.

In November 2023, F2i closing of 3 new transactions in Europe by IDF1, reaching more than €310 million of invested capital in 12 months, which represent 75% of the funds raised to date. The investments are focused on digital infrastructure and sustainable mobility, financing operators active mainly in Central and Western Europe in the sectors of telco towers, data centers and leasing of electric traction railway locomotives.

In December 2023, F2i closed the fundraising of the Sustainable Infrastructure Fund (Fund V), with an endowment of EUR 1.563 billion, exceeding the initial target of EUR 1.5 billion. The total funding of the five funds managed by F2i thus reaches 7.4 billion euros.

In order to support anti-violence centres and organisations that work in Italy to prevent and combat gender-based violence and violence against minors, in January 2024 F2i donated EUR 500,000 to the Una Nessuna Centomila Foundation.

In January 2024 F2i hits the funding target of F2i–Rete Digitale: It will invest 1 billion in NetCo, Tim's national fixed network alongside KKR and Mef.

== Investment sectors ==
The companies belonging to the F2i network make up the country's main infrastructure platform, spanning key sectors of the national economy:

- Energy for Transition
- Distribution Networks
- Telecommunication Networks
- Transport and Logistics
- Health and social care infrastructure
- Circular Economy

== Shareholders of F2i SGR ==
The subscribers of F2i funds are major institutional investors, both Italian and foreign: banks, banking foundations, asset managers, sovereign wealth funds, social security institutions and pension funds.

Pension funds: 26%

- Inarcassa
- CIPAG
- Bank foundations: 25%
- Compagnia di San Paolo
- Ente CR Florence
- Fondazione di Sardegna
- Fondazione Cariplo
- Fondazione Cassa di Risparmio di Torino
- Fondazione Cassa di Risparmio di Lucca
- Fondazione Cassa di Risparmio di Padova e Rovigo
- Fondazione Cassa dei Risparmi di Forlì
- Fondazione Cassa di Risparmio di Cuneo

Banks: 20%

- Intesa San Paolo
- Unicredit

Sovereign Wealth Funds and Asset Managers: 15%

- China Investment Corporation
- National Pension Service
- Ardian

Public institutions: 14%

- Cdp

== Equity Investments ==
=== F2i First Fund ===
As of 13 December 2017, the First F2i Fund was merged by incorporation into the Third F2i Fund, which thus inherited its shareholdings in companies operating in four different infrastructure platforms (gas distribution, airport management, solar power generation, and integrated water cycle), which are market leaders in their sectors and are characterised by still significant development and growth opportunities.

=== F2i Second Fund ===
In October 2012, being that the initial 1.85 billion had already been almost completely invested, F2i launched its Second Fund, which completed its fund raising in July 2015 reaching a total fund size of 1.24 billion, above the initial target of 1.2 billion. Second Fund's portfolio:

- SEA
- KOS
- Sorgenia

=== F2i Third Fund ===
In 2017 F2i launched a Third Fund. After a 3.14 billion first closing, at the final closing the fund raised an overall amount of 3.6 billion euro, after that the initial 3.3 billion target had been raised. Third Fund's portfolio:

- 2i Rete Gas
- IREN Acqua
- GESAC
- SEA
- SAGAT
- Aeroporto di Bologna
- Aeroporto Friuli Venezia Giulia - Trieste Airport
- So.Ge.A.Al
- Infracis
- F2i Holding Portuale
- Farmacie Italiane Srl
- EF Solare Italia
- EI Towers
- RTR
- Persidera
- GEASAR
- Ital Gas Storage

Fonte: f2isgr.it

=== Ania F2i Fourth Fund ===
In February 2020, the first closing of a fourth fund launched by Ania - the National Association of Insurance Companies - and managed by F2i, was announced. Fourth Fund's portfolio:

- CFI – Compagnia Ferroviaria Italiana
- GEASAR
- F2i Holding portuale
- Ital Gas Storage
- SO.GE.A.AL

=== F2i Sustainable Infrastructure Fund (Fifth Fund) ===
In May 2021, the launch of the fifth fund with a target of EUR 1.5 billion was announced, of which around EUR 900 million had already been raised at the first closing. The fund aims to identify companies operating in the infrastructure sector that can combine industrial growth with continuous improvement in environmental, social and governance (ESG) parameters. The management of these companies will be selected and measured on their ability to manage these objectives in an integrated manner.

Fifth Fund's portfolio:

- ReLife
- Ital Gas Storage
- Althea

=== Infrastructure Debt Fund - IDF1 ===
In August 2022, F2i launched its first infrastructure debt fund with a target amount of EUR 500 million, exceeding EUR 7 billion in funding.

The Fund aims to mobilise long-term capital by offering institutional investors (in particular insurance funds, insurance companies, pension funds, banking foundations) in Italy and EU countries an opportunity to invest in infrastructure sectors with a strong impact on economic and social growth, through a product that offers a particularly attractive return in the world fixed income.

== Divested assets ==
- Interporto Rivalta Scrivia (2011)
- Enel Stoccaggi (2012)
- TRM (2016)
- Metroweb (2016)
- Alerion Clean Power (2017)
- Software Design (2019)
- SIA (2019)
- E2i Energie Speciali (2021)
- Irideos (2022)
- Towertel (2022)

== Sustainability ==
In March 2019, F2i signed up the Principles for Responsible Investments promoted by the United Nations.

In August 2020, F2i presented its first Integrated sustainability report.

In May 2021, F2i completed the first closing of the Sustainable Infrastructure Fund, with an approach to sustainability based on identifying companies operating in the infrastructure sector.

In October 2022, the third Integrated Sustainability Report was presented.

In February 2023, F2i joins the UN Global Compact.

== Awards ==
- In February 2019 won the PFI “Deal of the Year” Award for the acquisition on the solar energy company RTR
