= Eloquens (software) =

Text-to-speech software

- Other names: Er Finestra
- Developer: CSELT
- Release: 1993
- Stable release: 2.5 / 2002; 24 years ago
- Operating system: Windows
- Available in: Italian
- Type: Text to speech
- License: Proprietary Freeware

Eloquens, (commonly known under the alias Er Finestra) is a text-to-speech software, whose first version was released in 1993 by CSELT. It was the first commercial speech synthesis software able to speak Italian.

== Description ==
It was the first commercial product of the research center CSELT in the field of voice technology. It was built with diphone-technology aimed to reach a high computational efficiency. As a result, the produced voice is still "robotic", but more natural than the previous generation voice implemented in MUSA by CSELT itself. In the past, ELOQUENS was applied to automatically read timetables in the Italian train stations and some telephone services provided by Telecom Italia, e.g. the automated address book service.

In 1997 Eloquens was also used as a building block (synthezer module) in dialogue systems.

In summer of 2001, Eloquens has been used in the Italian radio station, Radio DeeJay, as part of a character named Er Finestra created by the radio station. Following of that, an updated version of Eloquens has been released in 2002 on Windows by a user called DaNieLz, using Er Finestra as software name. This updated version, features a theme applied to the program window with the logo of Radio DeeJay, and some new words and symbols has been added in the internal files, but leaving the voice engine and the features as the original.

Er Finestra turned to be the most famous version of the program, as it can be installed on Windows operating systems without problems.

Nowadays, both Eloquens and Er Finestra can be found as freeware: it is nowadays typically used in spoken comments in many YouTube videos, as well by voice acting characters.

== See also ==
- Loquendo
- vidby

== Bibliography ==
- Billi, Roberto; Canavesio, Franco; Ciaramella, Alberto; Nebbia, Luciano (November 1995). "Interactive voice technology at work: The CSELT experience". Speech Communication. 17 (3–4): 263–271. doi:10.1016/0167-6393(95)00030-R.
- Balestri, Marcello; Lazzaretto, Stefano; Salza, Pier Luigi; Sandri, Stefano (22 September 1993). "The CSELT system for Italian text-to-speech synthesis". 3rd European Conference on Speech Communication and Technology (Eurospeech 1993). pp. 2091–2094. doi:10.21437/Eurospeech.1993-468. S2CID 42744136.
- Nebbia, Luciano; Quazza, Silvia; Salza, Pier Luigi (1998). "A specialised speech synthesis technique for application to automatic reverse directory service". Proceedings 1998 IEEE 4th Workshop Interactive Voice Technology for Telecommunications Applications. IVTTA '98 (Cat. No.98TH8376). pp. 223–228. doi:10.1109/IVTTA.1998.727725. ISBN 0-7803-5028-6. S2CID 62411997.
- Baggia, Paolo; Castagneri, Giuseppe; Danieli, Morena (August 2000). "Field trials of the Italian Arise train timetable system". Speech Communication. 31 (4): 355–367. doi:10.1016/S0167-6393(99)00068-0.
