= Scuola Superiore Guglielmo Reiss Romoli =

Italian training center and publisher

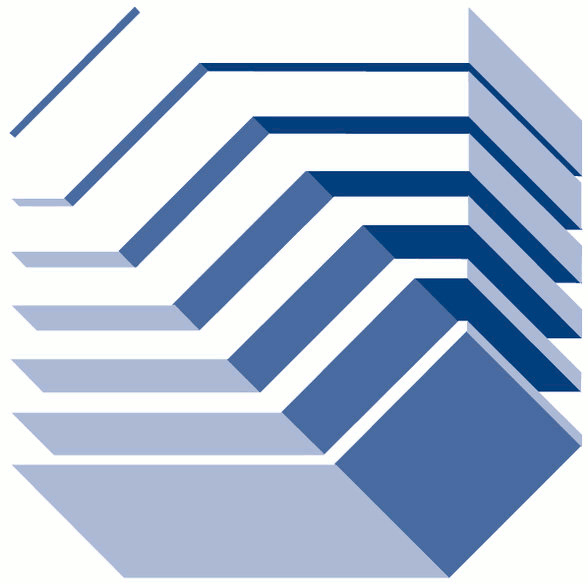

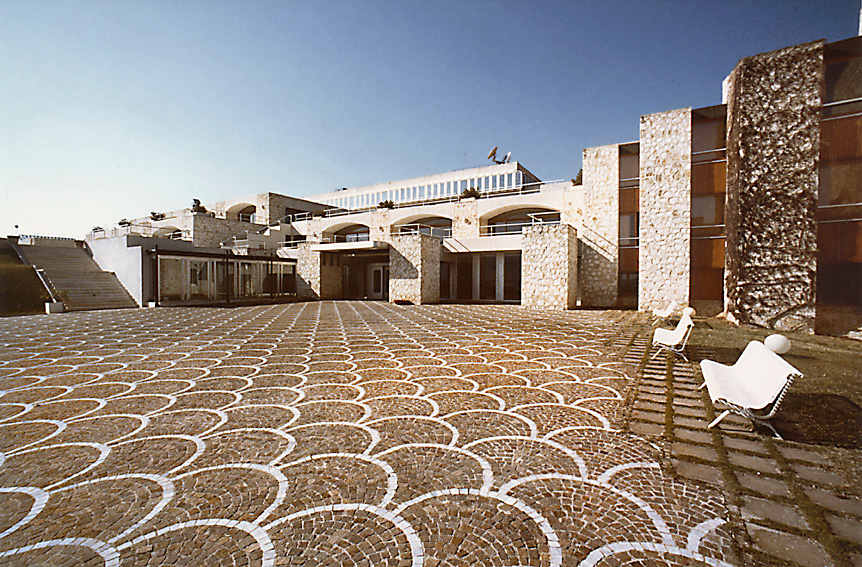
- Company type: società per azioni
- Industry: telecommunication
- Founded: July 28, 1976; 49 years ago in L'Aquila, AQ, Italy
- Founder: STET
- Defunct: 2009
- Headquarters: L'Aquila, Italy
- Key people: (CEO): Luigi Bonavoglia; Saverio Rotella; Antonio Zappi; Marco Coletti; Agostino Ragosa; Maurizio Tarquini; Renzo Bracciali
- Products: training, publishing
- Owner: Telecom Italia
- Number of employees: 220 (2009)
- Parent: Telecom Italia
- Website: reissromoli.com

Scuola Superiore Guglielmo Reiss Romoli (SSGRR) was the Telecom Italia’s Post-Graduate International Academy and research centre in information and communication technologies, founded in L'Aquila on 1976 by STET and that concluded its activities in 2009.

== History ==
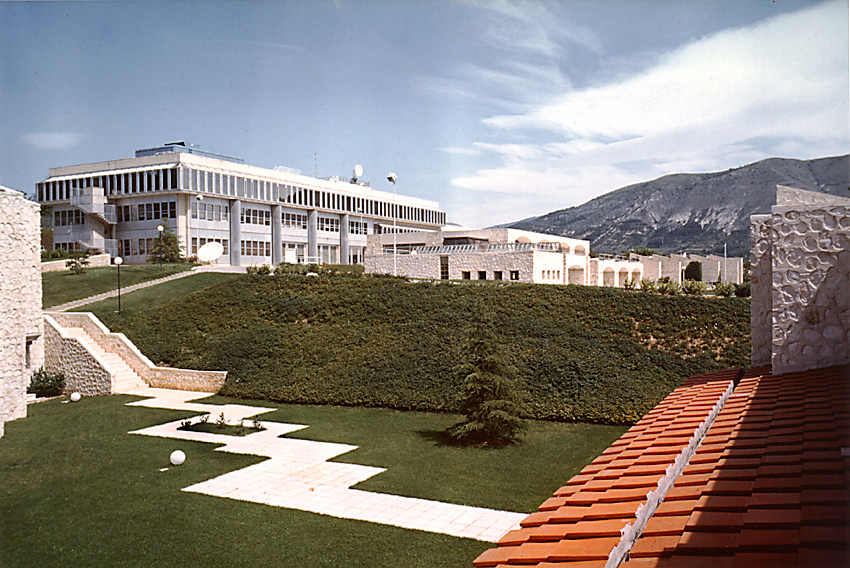
Campus

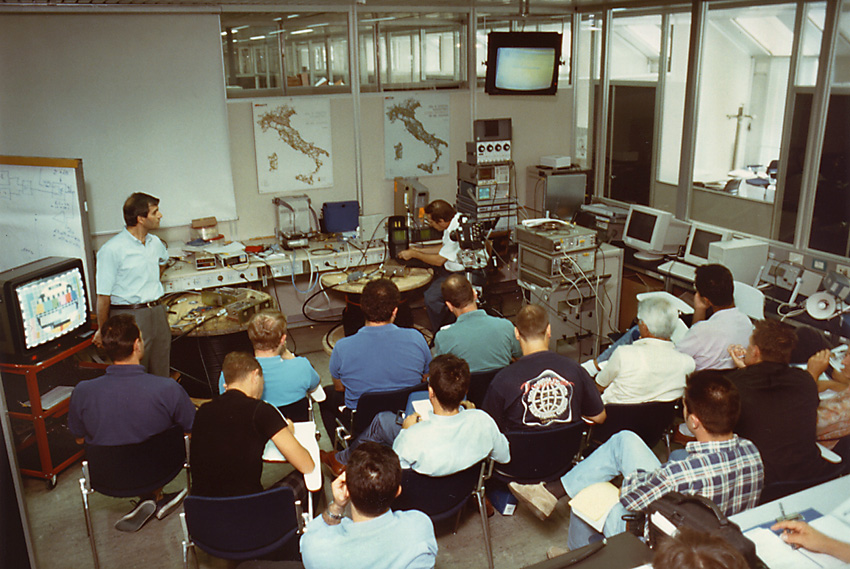
Laboratories

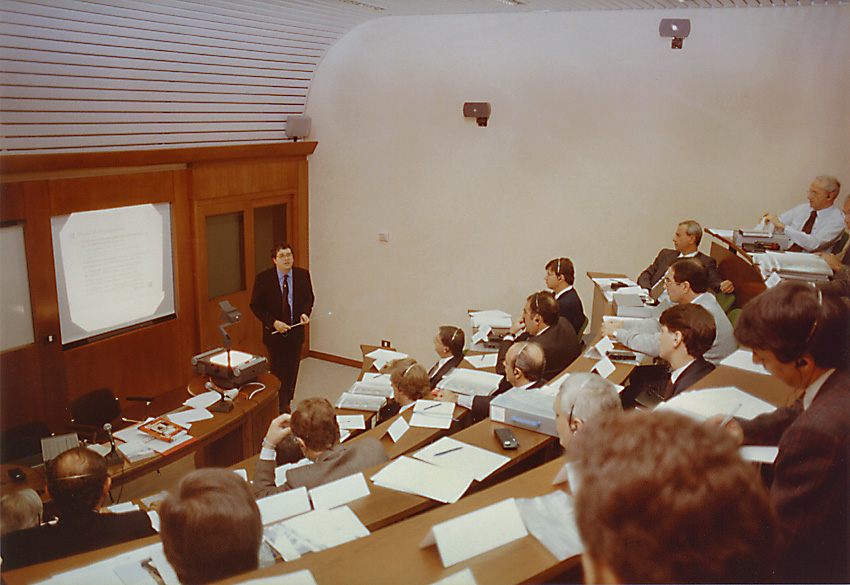
Simultaneous interpreting during a class

The school, named after Guglielmo Reiss Romoli, the first post-war STET general manager, was founded consequently to the need to train the new engineers and executives in the telecommunications industry. SSGRR began its operations in a temporary office in L'Aquila in 1972, while waiting for the construction of its campus in Coppito, near L'Aquila. The school's legal status turned to a closed joint-stock company on July 28, 1976, and the official opening of the campus took place in 1977. In 1976 the first director of the school was Luigi Bonavoglia, who successively became president of the school in 1985.

The school was originally intended for post-graduate training of SIP and STET managers and executives. The lecturers were partly internal and partly coming from other companies or from Italian and international universities and research centers, like CSELT. The fields addressed by the training and research activities were both technical in the ICT sector (architecture of telecommunications networks and services, telecommunications infrastructures and technologies, information technology) and managerial (marketing and strategy, organization, regulation).

The SSGRR's scope of work was very wide, because the group was composed of companies ranging from the design of integrated circuits in SGS, to software development and equipment design in Italtel, to telecommunications services operation by SIP. The activities were progressively open to participants from companies outside the STET group, consolidating the role of the school as a center of excellence in the ICT sector.

In 2001 took place the merger by incorporation into SSGRR of other Telecom Italia group's companies dealing with training (Consiel Formazione and Trainet) and of the training centers of Telecom Italia, globally rebranded as Telecom Italia Learning Services (TILS). In July 2006, the spin-off of TILS from the Telecom Italia group took place establishing a new company, TILS Holding, owned by Cegos and Camporlecchio Educational. After several corporate and judicial events, which led to the arrest of the managing director Renzo Bracciali on April 28, 2009, TILS Holding ended its operations in 2009.

Following the shutdown of the company, a large part of the staff was re-absorbed in the HR Services subsidiary of Telecom Italia, and the Reiss Romoli brand was taken over by a group of former school employees who relaunched the training activities through a new company, still based in L'Aquila.

== Architecture ==
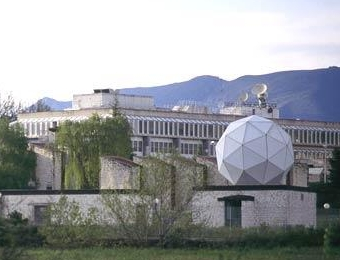
Satellite antennas

The design of the ‘Reiss Romoli’ school was carried out by the Antonelli-Greco Studio in Rome, who built a campus inspired to Anglo-Saxon colleges. The structure is characterized by stone walls and made with special anti-seismic criteria. It covers 170 thousand square meters with five tennis courts, one soccer field, a multipurpose facility, a fitness trail, swimming pool and two gyms.

The main body of the building houses all the facilities dedicated to educational activities, such as the classrooms, the auditorium, the library, the laboratories, the publishing centre and the multimedia centre. It also hosts the offices of the school staff. On the right of the central body with respect to the main entrance there is the block of the initial 120 residences, with an additional block of 80 residences to the left.

After the end of school activities and the 2009 L'Aquila earthquake, the campus was used for a while by the University of L'Aquila and remained unused later on.

== Activities ==
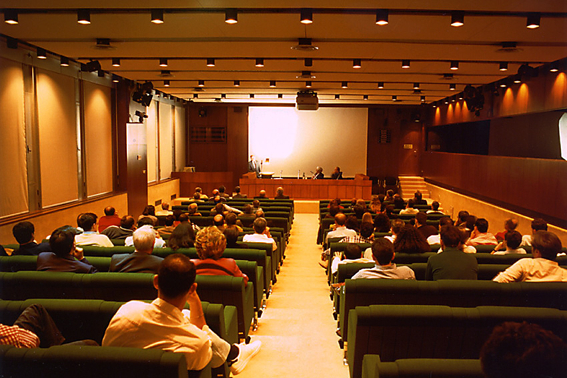
Auditorium

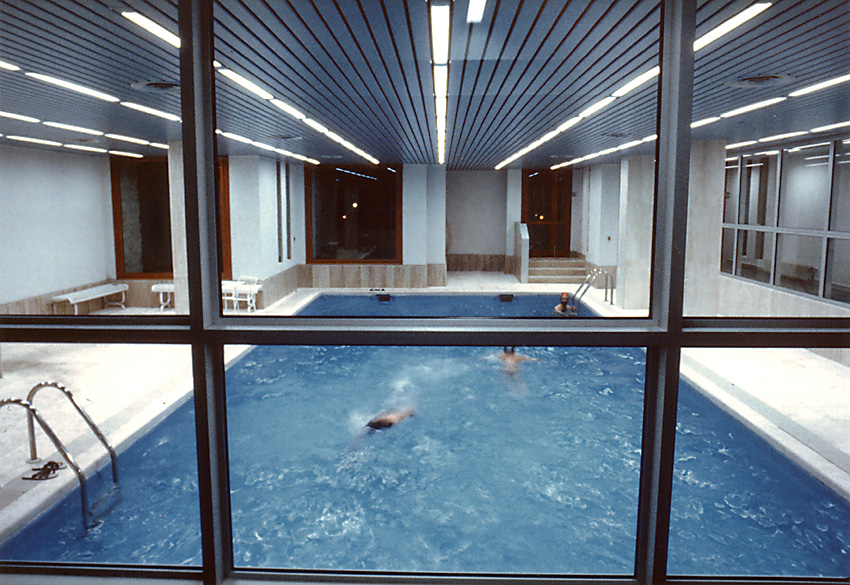
Swimming pool

The school training activities were mainly based on a residential model, the reason the campus had been built. The organization of the courses was carried out by the internal faculty, with internal lecturers specialized in both technical and managerial areas; they were supported by external lecturers from universities, research centres and companies in the ICT industry. To support the didactic activity, laboratories were available to perform tests and measurements on equipment similar to the ones used in the field by the operators.

The courses were organized both on demand, and on proposal through a catalogue of programs. An example of on demand activity was the Corso di Perfezionamento in Telecomunicazioni (Telecommunications Specialization Course), lasting several months and mandatory for all the newly hired employees of the Telecom Italia group. The catalogue training counted around 250 courses generally lasting one week and addressing information engineering, corporate management and international topics.

In 1996, the school started its e-learning activities. The most significant result in this area was the participation in the SkillPass project in 1999, organized by Sviluppo Italia (a governative development agency), with the training of about 700 participants on skills related to Internet and Web technologies.

Based on the availability of the internal faculty, consultancy activities were also offered both on training projects design and on specialist areas in the technical and managerial fields. All the school's educational activities were ISO 9001 certified, allowing Reiss Romoli to take part in calls for international organizations as well as for the public administration.

Leveraging on the campus infrastructure and the organization of international courses, the school also began to organize domestic and international conferences. A library with books and magazines was available for consultation by the participants.

To support its training activities, the school had a publishing and a multimedia production centre to distribute educational material. The publishing activity was progressively extended to the local printing of the quarterly newsletter Società dell'informazione (Information Society), the proceeding of the conferences held at its premise, and scientific books’ reprints.

== Publications ==
=== Anastatic reprints ===
1. Luigi Sacco (1986). Manuale di crittografia. L'Aquila: SSGRR. OCLC 876048483.
2. James Clerk Maxwell (1989). A treatise on electricity and magnetism. L'Aquila: SSGRR. ISBN 9780132006439. OCLC 949244806.
3. Galileo Galilei (1990). Discorsi e dimostrazioni matematiche intorno a due nuove scienze attenenti alla meccanica, ed ai movimenti locali. L'Aquila: SSGRR. ISBN 9788885280069.
4. Augusto Righi (1991). L'ottica delle oscillazioni elettriche: studio sperimentale sulla produzione di fenomeni analoghi ai principali fenomeni ottici per mezzo delle onde elettromagnetiche. L'Aquila: SSGRR. ISBN 9780132006439. OCLC 876048533.
5. Isaac Newton (1992). Mathematical Principles of Natural Philosophy. L'Aquila: SSGRR. ISBN 9788885280144.
6. John Renshaw Carson (1993). Electric circuit theory and the operational calculus. L'Aquila: SSGRR. ISBN 9788885280311.

=== Books ===
1. Felice Andreis, ed. (1977). Ingegneria del software (in Italian). L'Aquila: SSGRR.
2. Emiliano Pollino; Giorgio Baccarani; al (1987). L'affidabilità dei componenti elettronici a semiconduttore (in Italian). L'Aquila: SSGRR. OCLC 797218429.
3. Stefano Breccia (1988). Algoritmi per grafica mediante elaboratore (in Italian). L'Aquila: SSGRR. ISBN 9780132006439. OCLC 799842474.
4. Emanuele Angeleri; al (1990). Tecniche di trasmissione dati (in Italian). L'Aquila: SSGRR. ISBN 9788885280014.
5. Aldo Gilardini (1990). Teoria dei segnali (in Italian). L'Aquila: SSGRR. ISBN 9788885280007.
6. Luigi Bonavoglia (1991). Il segnale telefonico (in Italian). L'Aquila: SSGRR. ISBN 9788885280090.
7. Paolo Corsini; Graziano Frosini (1991). Architettura dei sistemi a microprocessore (in Italian). L'Aquila: SSGRR. ISBN 9788885280076.
8. Milena Buttò (1991). Ingegneria del traffico nelle reti di telecomunicazioni (in Italian). L'Aquila: SSGRR. ISBN 9788885280106.
9. Eraldo Damosso; Loris Stola; Paolo Semenzato (1992). Radiopropagazione (in Italian). L'Aquila: SSGRR. ISBN 9788885280168.
10. P L Bargellini; Aldo Gilardini; al (1992). Comunicazioni spaziali (in Italian). L'Aquila: SSGRR. ISBN 9788885280137.
11. Guido Paladin; Gaetano Vespasiano (1992). Collegamenti in fibra ottica (in Italian). L'Aquila: SSGRR. ISBN 9788885280120.
12. Domenico Serafini (1993). La rete numerica integrata nei servizi (ISDN) (in Italian). L'Aquila: SSGRR. ISBN 9788885280342.
13. Franco Grimaldi; Valerio Zingarelli; Paolo Semenzato (1993). Sistemi radiomobili cellulari (in Italian). L'Aquila: SSGRR. ISBN 9788885280113.
14. Jules Kadish; Attilia Properzi (1993). Marketing internazionale (in Italian). L'Aquila: SSGRR. ISBN 9788885280359.
15. Giovanni Cancellieri; Ennio Gambi (1994). Probabilità e fenomeni aleatori (in Italian). L'Aquila: SSGRR. ISBN 9788885280304.
16. Maurizio Ambrosini; Gabriele Gabrielli; al (1994). Risorsa umana, sistemi sociali e cultura d'impresa: letture per valorizzare la persona nelle organizzazioni (in Italian). L'Aquila: SSGRR. ISBN 9788885280298.
17. Giorgio Levi; Frederic Patricelli (1994). Prolog: Linguaggio, applicazioni ed implementazioni (in Italian). L'Aquila: SSGRR. ISBN 9788885280151.
18. Franco Ferrarotti; Pietro Crespi (1994). La parola operaia: cento anni di vita operaia, 1892-1992 (in Italian). L'Aquila: SSGRR. ISBN 9788885280274.
19. Silvano Gai; Pier Luca Montessoro; Pietro Nicoletti (1995). Reti locali. Dal cablaggio all'internetworking (in Italian). L'Aquila: SSGRR. ISBN 9788885280229.
20. Roberto Pignatelli, ed. (1995). Le reti a commutazione di pacchetto X 25 (in Italian). L'Aquila: SSGRR. ISBN 9788885280267.
21. Stefano Breccia (1995). I numeri nella storia dell'umanità (in Italian). L'Aquila: SSGRR. ISBN 9788885280212.
22. Mauro Giaconi; Roberto Piermarini; Paolo Semenzato (1995). Modulazione numerica (in Italian). L'Aquila: SSGRR. ISBN 9788885280328.
23. Piero Carducci; Raffaele Pugliesi (1995). La valutazione degli investimenti in formazione (in Italian). L'Aquila: SSGRR. ISBN 9788885280250.
24. Aldo Roveri (1995). Reti di telecomunicazioni: principi generali (in Italian). L'Aquila: SSGRR. ISBN 9788885280236.
25. Mauro Giaconi (1995). Analisi dei sistemi di trasmissione (in Italian). L'Aquila: SSGRR. ISBN 9788885280205.
26. Umberto Pellegrini (1995). Il libro elettronico: un nuovo strumento per imparare (in Italian). L'Aquila: SSGRR. ISBN 9788885280243.
27. Pietro Valocchi; Daniele Sereno (1996). Codifica numerica del segnale audio (in Italian). L'Aquila: SSGRR. ISBN 9788885280557.
28. Riccardo Melen (1996). Architetture di commutazione ATM (in Italian). L'Aquila: SSGRR. ISBN 9788885280366.
29. Attilia Properzi (1996). Il marketing delle telecomunicazioni: dal monopolio alla concorrenza. L'analisi dell'evoluzione attraverso alcuni casi (in Italian). L'Aquila: SSGRR. ISBN 9788885280380.
30. AA.VV. (1996). Problemi della società dell'informazione: articoli tratti da Società dell'informazione, 1992-1996 (in Italian). L'Aquila: SSGRR. ISBN 9788885280540.
31. Giuseppe Lizza, ed. (1997). Terzo millennio. Dal bosone di Higgs al villaggio virtuale (in Italian). L'Aquila: SSGRR. ISBN 9788885280410.
32. Attilio Achler (1997). Easy GSM (in Italian). L'Aquila: SSGRR. ISBN 9788885280427.
33. Gaetano Vespasiano, ed. (1997). Le fibre ottiche per telecomunicazioni (in Italian). L'Aquila: SSGRR. ISBN 9788885280373.
34. Umberto Silvestri (1998). La rivoluzione delle telecomunicazioni (in Italian). L'Aquila: SSGRR. ISBN 9788885280489.
35. Mauro Giaconi; Roberto Piermarini; Paolo Semenzato (1999). Trasmissione numerica (in Italian). L'Aquila: SSGRR. ISBN 9788885280519.
36. Gianfranco Pasquino (1999). Capire l'Europa (in Italian). L'Aquila: SSGRR. ISBN 9780132006439. OCLC 849199557.
37. Laura Nardone; Tiziana Paris (1997). Antonio Zappi (ed.). Teorie organizzative. Lezioni di organizzazione aziendale (in Italian). Vol. 1. L'Aquila: SSGRR. ISBN 9788885280403.
38. Attilia Properzi (1996). Antonio Zappi (ed.). Analisi strategica e quadro competitivo. Lezioni di organizzazione aziendale (in Italian). Vol. 2. L'Aquila: SSGRR. ISBN 9788885280175.
39. Piero Carducci; Marina Braccini (1998). Antonio Zappi (ed.). Le strutture organizzative. Lezioni di organizzazione aziendale (in Italian). Vol. 3. L'Aquila: SSGRR. ISBN 9788885280458.
40. Piero Carducci; Dante Mancini (1996). Antonio Zappi (ed.). I meccanismi operativi. Lezioni di organizzazione aziendale (in Italian). Vol. 4. L'Aquila: SSGRR. ISBN 9788885280564.
41. Marina Giardini; Roberta Nicchiarelli (1998). Antonio Zappi (ed.). Gestione delle risorse umane. Lezioni di organizzazione aziendale (in Italian). Vol. 5. L'Aquila: SSGRR. ISBN 9788885280465.
42. Roberta Nicchiarelli (1996). Antonio Zappi (ed.). La leadership. Lezioni di organizzazione aziendale (in Italian). Vol. 6. L'Aquila: SSGRR. ISBN 9788885280595.
43. Piero Carducci; Luciana Del Beato (1997). Antonio Zappi (ed.). Le aziende di servizi nella realtà contemporanea. Lezioni di organizzazione aziendale (in Italian). Vol. 7. L'Aquila: SSGRR. ISBN 9788885280441.
44. Marina Braccini (1998). Antonio Zappi (ed.). La qualità totale come strategia competitiva. Lezioni di organizzazione aziendale (in Italian). Vol. 8. L'Aquila: SSGRR. ISBN 9788885280472.
45. Piero Carducci; Alessandro Fiocco (1999). Antonio Zappi (ed.). Il paradigma gerarchia-mercato nelle decisioni di outsourcing dell'information technology. Lezioni di organizzazione aziendale (in Italian). Vol. 9. L'Aquila: SSGRR. ISBN 9788885280496.
46. Luciana Del Beato; Valentina Madama (1999). Antonio Zappi (ed.). La strategia del servizio nella nuova economia. Lezioni di organizzazione aziendale (in Italian). Vol. 10. L'Aquila: SSGRR. ISBN 9788885280502.

=== Proceedings ===
1. Convegno sui ponti radio. L'Aquila: SSGRR. May 17, 1979.
2. Yannis Tsividis; Paolo Antognetti, eds. (June 18–29, 1984). Design of MOS VLSI circuits for telecommunications. L'Aquila: SSGRR. ISBN 9780132006439.
3. International EURASIP Workshop on Coding of HDTV Vol. 1. L'Aquila: SSGRR. November 12–13, 1986. ISBN 9780132006439. OCLC 931019589.
4. International EURASIP Workshop on Coding of HDTV Vol. 2. L'Aquila: SSGRR. November 12–13, 1986. ISBN 9780132006439. OCLC 931019543.
5. Identificazione di modelli controllo di sistemi elaborazione di segnali. L'Aquila: SSGRR. 1989. ISBN 9780132006439. OCLC 909374856.
6. 2nd International Workshop on Signal Processing of HDTV. L'Aquila: SSGRR. February 29 – March 2, 1988. ISBN 9780132006439. OCLC 931019574.
7. Vito Cappellini, ed. (April 1992). Intelligent terminals - COST 229 action (WG.3) workshop. L'Aquila: SSGRR.
8. C. Verkerk, ed. (August 30 – September 12, 1992). 1992 CERN School of Computing. L'Aquila: SSGRR. OCLC 898903512.
9. Francesco Melchiorri; Pierre Encrenaz, eds. (1992). Infrared astronomy from space. L'Aquila: SSGRR.
10. C. Verkerk, ed. (September 12–25, 1993). 1993 CERN School of Computing. L'Aquila: SSGRR. OCLC 257538990.
11. W J Barr; A Pelaggi, eds. (1993). TINA '93: Proceedings of the Fourth Telecommunications Information Networking Architecture Workshop. L'Aquila: SSGRR. ISBN 9780132006439. OCLC 221581267.
12. Summer course on Power electronics and drives. L'Aquila: SSGRR. July 28 – August 3, 1994.
13. Delphi '99 : Italia : primi passi nel nuovo millennio. L'Aquila: SSGRR. 1999.
14. 7th IFIP/IEEE International workshop on distributed systems operations & management. L'Aquila: SSGRR. October 28–30, 1996. ISBN 9780132006439. OCLC 438711003.
15. Frederic Patricelli; Pradeep K Ray, eds. (June 29 – July 1, 2001). HEALTHCOM2001: 3rd International Workshop on Enterprise Networking and Computing in Healthcare Industry. L'Aquila: SSGRR. ISBN 9788885280533.
16. International Conference on Advances in Infrastructure for Electronic Business, Science and Education on the Internet. L'Aquila: SSGRR. July 31 – August 6, 2000. ISBN 88-85280-52-8.
17. Lars Frank, ed. (August 6–12, 2001). International Conference on Advances in Infrastructure for Electronic Business, Science and Education on the Internet. L'Aquila: SSGRR. ISBN 88-85280-61-7.
18. International Conference on Advances in Infrastructure for e-Business, e-Education, e-Science and e-Medicine on the Internet. L'Aquila: SSGRR. January 21–27, 2002. ISBN 88-85280-62-5.
19. International Conference on Advances in Infrastructure for e-Business, e-Education, e-Science and e-Medicine on the Internet. L'Aquila: SSGRR. July 29 – August 4, 2002. ISBN 88-85280-63-3.
20. International Conference on Advances in Infrastructure for Electronic Business, Science and Education on the Internet. L'Aquila: SSGRR. January 6–12, 2003. ISBN 9788885280755.
21. International Conference on Advances in Infrastructure for e-Business, e-Education, e-Science, e-Medicine and Mobile Technologies on the Internet. L'Aquila: SSGRR. 28 July – 3 August 2003. ISBN 88-85280-74-9.
