= Allione =

Allione is an Italian surname thought to come from the Italian regions of Piedmont and Liguria. It is a diminutive of the Latin alio meaning "other". After Italians began to emigrate to other countries like the United States, Argentina, and Australia, Allione started to spread outside Italy.

Notable people with this surname include:

- Agustín Allione (born 1994), Argentine footballer
- Grégory Allione (born 1971), French firefighter and politician
- Miro Allione (1932–2006), Italian executive
- Tsultrim Allione (born 1947), American author and teacher
