= Valerio Zingarelli =

CEO and chairman of Babelgum

Valerio Zingarelli was the chairman of the board and chief executive officer of Babelgum. He took up the position in July 2007, taking over from former CEO and co-founder Erik Lumer. Previously Zingarelli was an independent board member of Fastweb, the second largest Italian fixed line TelCo.

== Biography ==
Valerio Zingarelli graduated in electronic engineering from the Polytechnic University of Turin, Italy, in 1978.

In 1980, Zingarelli started working at CSELT (Centro Studi E Laboratori Telecomunicazioni), Telecom Italia's research centre in Turin, where he worked in the radio transmission division and managed activities on both fixed and mobile radio transmission. He worked on the pan-European digital mobile radio system (GSM) in the 900 MHz and 1800 MHz bands, the Italian and European terrestrial microwave radio-relay systems, and the first Italian domestic digital satellite system ITALSAT 1. He then worked for Alenia, Italy's main aerospace company based in Turin, where he was in charge of radio communications for both civil and military systems. In 1994, he became CTO of Omnitel and built the company's GSM network from scratch. From 2002 to 2005, he was the global director of networks and service platforms at Vodafone Italy (formerly Omnitel), in charge of managing all the group's technology activities and strategy, including customer terminals.

Since 1991 Zingarelli has been an aggregate Professor at the Polytechnic University of Turin, Italy, where he held courses on electronic communications and digital transmission.

In February 2019, he resigned as CEO of Polymnia, the company that built the M9 museum for the Venice Foundation.
