= TIM San Marino =

San Marino telecommunications company

TIM San Marino S.p.A.
- Formerly: Intelcom S.p.A. (1992-2005); Telecom Italia San Marino S.p.A. (2005-2017)
- Company type: Subsidiary
- Industry: Telecommunications
- Founded: 1992; 34 years ago
- Founder: STET
- Headquarters: Borgo Maggiore, San Marino
- Area served: San Marino
- Products: Fixed, public and mobile telephony, Internet, VoIP, DNS
- Owner: TIM (100%)
- Number of employees: 38 (2009)
- Parent: TIM
- Subsidiaries: Telefonia Mobile Sammarinese (51%)
- Website: www.tim.sm

TIM San Marino S.p.A. (originally Intelcom S.p.A. and later Telecom Italia San Marino S.p.A.) is a Sammarinese telecommunications company, subsidiary of TIM S.p.A., mainly focused on VoIP services and other telephony services primarily targeted to ethnic and immigrant populations.

It offer also fixed and mobile telephony services, Internet access, and is also the official Domain Name Registry for .sm, the top-level domain of San Marino.

Founded in 1992, it offers its customers a continuous service without additional costs also in Italy. In fact, the operator uses the Italian numbering to offer an offer specifically designed for the Sammarinese market, although based on the international prefix +39 for Italy.

== Services ==
Telecom Italia San Marino offers the following types of telecommunications services:

- Services for private and corporate users mainly intended for the Republic of San Marino
- Platform services
- Internet data center services
- Top-Level Domain registration authority (.sm)

== Logo history ==
1992-2005

2005-2016

2016-

== See also ==
- Telecom Italia
- Telecom Italia Mobile
- TIMvision
