= RIPAC (microprocessor) =

Microprocessor for speech recognition

RIPAC was a VLSI single-chip microprocessor designed for automatic recognition of the connected speech, one of the first of this use.

The project of the microprocessor RIPAC started in 1984. RIPAC was aimed to provide efficient real-time speech recognition services to the italian telephone system provided by SIP. The microprocessor was presented in September 1986 at The Hague (Netherlands) at EUSPICO conference. It was composed of 70.000 transistors and structured as Harvard architecture.

The name RIPAC is the acronym for "Riconoscimento del PArlato Connesso", that means "Recognition of the connected speech" in Italian. The microprocessor was designed by the Italian companies CSELT and ELSAG and was produced by SGS: a combination of Hidden Markov Model and Dynamic Time Warping algorithms was used for processing speech signals. It was able to do real-time speech recognition of Italian and many languages with a good affordability. The chip, issued by U.S. Patent No. 4,907,278, worked at first run.

== Bibliography ==
- Cecinati, Riccardo; Ciaramella, Alberto; Licciardi, Luigi; Venuti, Giovanni (1989). "Implementation of a dynamic time warp integrated circuit for large vocabulary isolated and connected speech recognition". First European Conference on Speech Communication and Technology, EUROSPEECH 1989, Paris, France, September 27-29, 1989. ISCA: 1565–1568.
- Cecinati, Riccardo; Ciaramella, Alberto; Venuti, Giovanni; Vicenzi, Cesare (1987). "A Custom Integrated Circuit with Dynamic Time Warping for Speech Recognition". CSELT Technical Reports. 15 (1).
- Riccardo Cecinati, Alberto Ciaramella, Luigi Licciardi, Maurizio Paolini, Roberto Tasso, & Giovanni Venuti (1990). U.S. Patent No. 4,907,278. Washington, DC: U.S. Patent and Trademark Office.
