= Stream TV =

Defunct Italian television company

Stream
- Type: SPA
- Industry: Telecommunication
- Founded: 1993
- Founder: Miro Allione
- Defunct: July 31, 2003
- Fate: Merged With TELE+ in Sky Italia
- Successor: Sky Italia
- Headquarters: Rome and Milan, Italy
- Area served: Nationwide
- Key people: Miro Allione (founder, president and CEO until 1999)
- Products: Pay TV
- Parent: STET (1993); Telecom Italia (1999); News Corp
- Website: http://stream.it

Stream TV was an Italian digital satellite television pay TV company launched in 1993 and closed in 2003, due to the merge with TELE+ into Sky Italia.

== History ==
Stream S.P.A. was the service provider, a television company owned by STET. It was founded in 1993 by Miro Allione, a STET managing director. Stream TV started broadcasting as a digital pay TV company and later included satellite television. The company had conflicts with TELE+ for several years, especially for the broadcasting rights of the Italian football league Serie A. In 1999, part of the company was sold by Telecom Italia to News Corporation. In March 2003, TELE+ and Stream merged into Sky Italia.
