= Selenia GP-16 =

General purpose minicomputer

The Selenia Gp-16 was a general purpose minicomputer designed by the Italian company Selenia of STET group. It was followed by an upgraded version called Gp-160.

== History ==
The Gp-16 was minicomputer designed mainly for industrial customers, whose concept in design was similar to PDP-8. The design took place in Rome during the mid-sixties under the supervision of Saverio Rotella, when the production was carried in Fusaro (Naples) in the second half of that decade.

The most known uses were in control tower in airports, as done in Venice; a modified upgraded version was used in Gruppi Speciali of CSELT, the second electromechanical phone switch in Europe. The Gp16 was later adopted also by Olivetti. However, it never reached a large diffusion because of a small market push from its producing company.

== Technical features ==
=== Hardware ===
Gp-16 had:

- word length: 16-bit;
- RAM memory: 8 Kbyte, extensibile to 32 Kbyte (when the CSELT version extended it until 64 Kbyte);
- cycle time: 4 microseconds;
- ROM technology: magnetic-core memory;
- input/output peripherals: punched card reader, punched tape reader, teleprinter.

=== Software ===
- No true Operating system;
- Fortran Compiler;
- Arithmetical calculation Routine;
- Monitor processing system;
- Assembly language.

== Bibliography ==
- Fondazione Adriano Olivetti, La cultura informatica in Italia: riflessioni e testimonianze sulle origini: 1950-1970, Bollati Boringhieri, 1993.
