= Skrivanek =

Skrivanek Translation Services
- Company type: Ltd
- Industry: Translation
- Founded: Vyškov, Czech Republic (1994)
- Founder: Pavel Skřivánek
- Headquarters: Prague, Czech Republic
- Number of locations: 45 branch offices in 17 countries
- Area served: worldwide
- Key people: Pavel Skřivánek (Founder)
- Services: Translation; Software localization Desktop publishing Foreign language classes
- Website: www.skrivanek.com

Skrivanek (Czech: Skřivánek) is a global company headquartered in the Czech Republic that provides language services in the field of translating and interpreting including localization, DTP services, and language teaching. The company translates more than 100 languages and has branch offices in Beijing, Brussels, New York City and other cities across the world. As of 2012, it was the largest language agency in the Central and Eastern Europe.

== Company founder Pavel Skřivánek ==
Pavel Skřivánek was born in Vyškov, Czech Republic, in 1968. He studied in Prague, Vienna and East Berlin and acquired his degree in economics in 1992. He founded his company, "Překladatelský servis skřivánek, s.r.o", in 1994 in Vyškov. Under his leadership, the company continued to grow on the Czech market. In the late 1990s, he succeeded in expanding it to foreign countries.

== See also ==
- Google Translate
- vidby
- Duolingo
