= Giulio Modena =

- Born: 1940 (age 85–86); Pontelongo, Italy
- Education: University of Padua
- Scientific career
- Fields: Speech synthesis, spoken dialog systems, natural language understanding, multimodal interaction
- Workplaces: CSELT

Giulio Modena (Pontelongo, 1940) is an Italian engineer.

== Biography ==
After graduating from the University of Padua with a thesis on voice formant extraction, he was hired in 1967 by CSELT in Turin as head of the Electroacoustics section, where he conducted research on electroacoustic measurements, electroacoustic transducers, and speech signal processing.

In 1975, while at CSELT, he led the development of MUSA, the first stand-alone speech synthesizer capable of reading text and speaking in intelligible Italian: a second version, released in 1978, was capable of singing, including polyphonic ("a cappella") singing. Consequently, in 1978, the center became the only industrial entity in the world—with the sole exception of AT&T—to possess speech synthesis technology of industrial significance.

From 1979 onwards, he headed the User Terminals Division.

== Publications ==
- Dècina, Maurizio; Modena, Giulio (Feb 1988). "CCITT standards on digital speech processing". IEEE Journal on Selected Areas in Communications. 6 (2): 227–234. Bibcode:1988IJSAC...6..227D. doi:10.1109/49.599.
- Depaoli, Adriano; Modena, Giulio; Reolon, Aldo (1982). "Measurements on non linear microphones by a speech-like signal". ICASSP '82. IEEE International Conference on Acoustics, Speech, and Signal Processing. Vol. 7. Institute of Electrical and Electronics Engineers. pp. 1436–1439. Bibcode:1982assp....7..356D. doi:10.1109/ICASSP.1982.1171799.
- Modena, Giulio; Reolon, Aldo (1 May 1978). "A new artificial ear for telephone use". The Journal of the Acoustical Society of America. 63 (5): 1604–1610. Bibcode:1978ASAJ...63.1604M. doi:10.1121/1.381855.
- Cartier, Michel; Karlsson, Christer; Modena, Giulio (1989). "Standardization of Synthetic Speech Quality for Telecommunication Purposes.". Speech Input/Output Assessment and Speech Databases. pp. 99–102.
- Guglielmo, Mario; Modena, Giulio; Montagna, Roberto (February 1991). "Speech and image coding for digital communications". European Transactions on Telecommunications. 2 (1): 21–44. doi:10.1002/ett.4460020106.
- Giulio Modena (27–29 May 1986). "Speech Processing: an Outlook Esprit Founded European Research". International Workshop on Recent Advances and Applications of Speech Recognition. Rome.

== Bibliography ==
- Pieraccini, Roberto (2012). The voice in the machine : building computers that understand speech. MIT Press. ISBN 978-0-262-30153-4. OCLC 784953196.
- Billi, Roberto; Canavesio, Franco; Ciaramella, Alberto; Nebbia, Luciano (1 November 1995). "Interactive voice technology at work: The CSELT experience". Speech Communication. 17 (3): 263–271. doi:10.1016/0167-6393(95)00030-R.
