= Telefonia Mobile Sammarinese =

TMS Telefonia Mobile Sammarinese S.p.A.
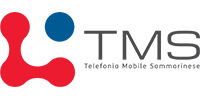
- Company type: Subsidiary
- Industry: Telecommunications
- Founded: 1999; 27 years ago
- Founder: Telecom Italia
- Headquarters: Borgo Maggiore, San Marino
- Area served: San Marino
- Products: Mobile telephony
- Owner: Telecom Italia San Marino (51%)
- Parent: Telecom Italia
- Website: www.tms.sm

TMS Telefonia Mobile Sammarinese S.p.A. is a Sammarinese telecommunications company, subsidiary of Telecom Italia San Marino S.p.A., that offers mobile telephony services.

Founded in 1999, it uses the TIM network, offering its customers a continuous service without additional costs also in Italy. The operator in fact uses two specific Italian numbering ranges (+39.335.733/4) to offer an offer specifically designed for the Sammarinese market, although based on the international prefix +39 for Italy.

== See also ==
- Telecom Italia
- Telecom Italia Mobile
- Telecom Italia San Marino
