= Pietro Labriola =

Italian business executive

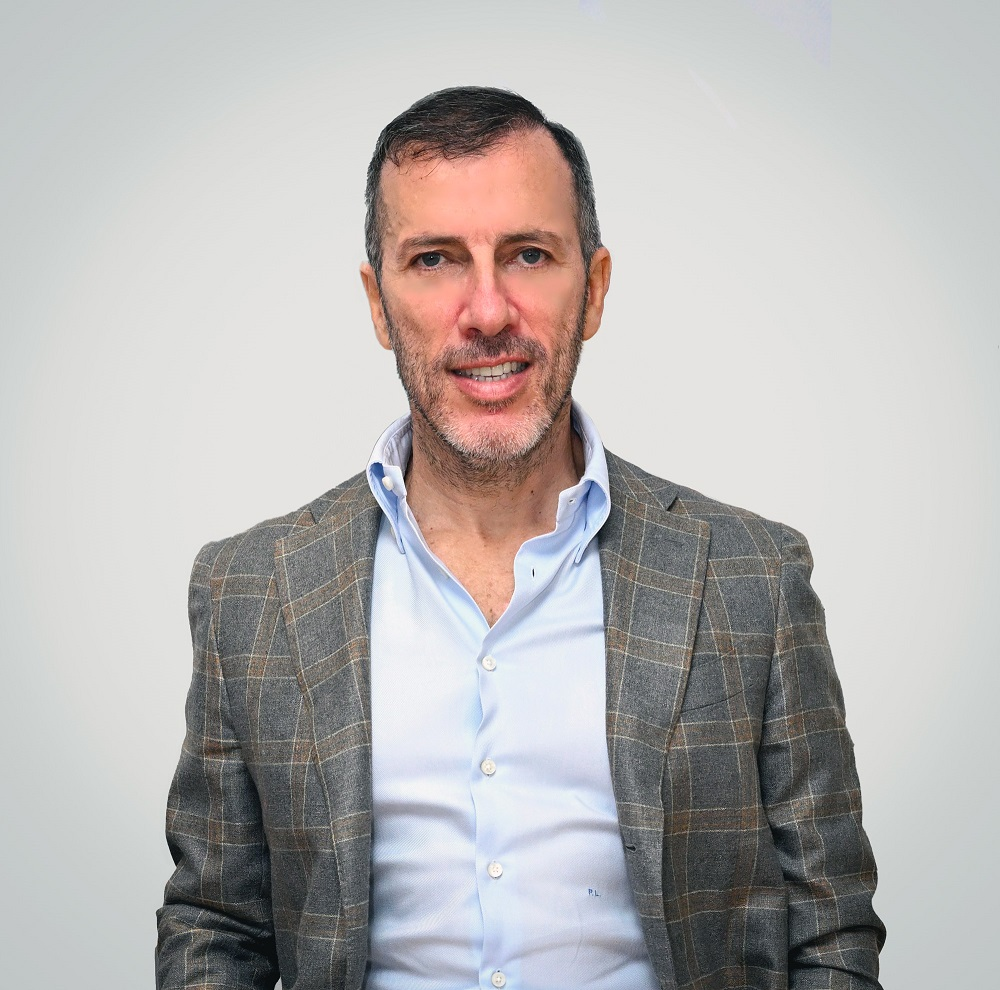
- Pietro Labriola, CEO of TIM
- Born: 1 October 1967 (age 58); Altamura, Italy
- Occupation: business executive

Pietro Labriola (born October 1, 1967, Altamura, Italy) is an Italian business executive who has been the chief executive officer and general manager of the TIM Group since January 2022.

== Early life and education ==
Pietro Labriola graduated in Economics and Commerce from the University of Bari. He then completed a Master's program in Management of Innovation and Technologies at Tecnopolis, Scientific and Technological Park of Bari.

== Career ==
Labriola entered the telecommunications sector early in his career, working from 1993 to 1994 as an assistant to the CEO of France Telecom in Milan. In 1995, he took on the role of Marketing Manager at Cable & Wireless Italia, while in 1996, he joined Infostrada S.p.A. as Head of Business Development, returning in 1998 as marketing director after a one-year experience at the consulting firm Boston Consulting Group.

He joined Telecom Italia in 2001, holding various positions of increasing responsibility. After his initial role as Marketing Manager for Fixed Services, he was appointed marketing director for Fixed and Mobile Services in 2005 and CEO of Matrix the following year. Subsequently, he took on the role of Head of Domestic Fixed Services in 2007, and that of Director of the Business Unit for the enterprise segment for fixed, mobile, and ICT services two years later. In 2013, he was appointed Head of Business Transformation & Quality.

In 2015, he relocated in Brazil to lead TIM Brazil, first as Chief Operating Officer and then as CEO from 2019, supporting the company's growth and development, including the acquisition of Oi, the third-largest telecommunications company in Latin America, and obtaining 5G licenses. During his tenure, he started the "Mulheres Positivas" project for women's personal and professional development through training, courses, and job offers.

Since January 21, 2022, Pietro Labriola has been the CEO of the TIM Group, following his appointment as General Manager on November 26, 2021. Among the initiatives he carried out are projects on the gender gap, included in the campaign "La Parità Non Può Aspettare" ("Equality Can't Wait"), such as the "Women Plus" app to enhance female professionalism – an initiative promoted with Women at Business and sponsored by the European Commission – and the collaboration with the association DonneXStrada to make TIM stores also places of first assistance for gender violence, called "Punti Viola". Among the other initiatives he carried out are projects such as "RompiLaBolla", a communication and digital literacy campaign scheduled for 2025 and developed in collaboration with various partners.

In March 2024, Pietro Labriola presented the TIM 2024-2026 Business Plan, which continued the transformation initiated during the previous two-year period. A key component of the plan was the separation of the fixed-line network infrastructure. Following the sale of the network, the company reported a reduction in its debt and a restructuring of its financial position.

In April 2024, the TIM shareholders' meeting elected the new Board of Directors, confirming Pietro Labriola as CEO for a second term.

In June 2025, the assembly of Assotelecomunicazioni (Asstel) has elected him as the new president for the 2025-2027 term.

From August 2025, to May 2026, he served as a non-executive director at Natuzzi, an Italian furniture brand listed on the New York Stock Exchange.

He is also active in the general debate on the telecommunications sector, arguing, for example, that infrastructure deployment alone is no longer sufficient for the sustainability of the industry, and emphasizing the necessity of evolving business models toward advanced digital services. He has also contributed to discussions on the geopolitics of data and the adoption of "coopetition" (cooperation and competition) models between major infrastructure operators and global platforms, collaborating on the 2024 Strategic Report of the Centro Economia Digitale.

== Other roles ==
Pietro Labriola holds several positions within industry associations and corporate boards. He is a member of the board of the GSMA, where he has advocated for the "fair share" principle, a proposal for large internet service providers to provide an equitable contribution toward the telecommunications infrastructure costs. Within Confindustria, he is a member of the board of the General Council and, since May 2024, has served as Special Advisor for the digital transition.

His roles in industry representation include the presidency of Asstel - Assotelecomunicazioni for the 2025-2027 term, a position he assumed after serving as the association's Vice President. Additionally, he represents TIM on the General Council of Aspen Institute Italia and is a member of the board of the European Institute of Oncology (IEO). Since April 2024, he has served on TIM's Sustainability Committee, and in April 2025, he was appointed a member of the High Council of the SPES Academy.

== Awards ==
Pietro Labriola has received various industry recognitions:

- 2020: he received the "Innovation" award at the fifth edition of the Money Report "Galeria de Notáveis" (December) and was named "Communications Man of the Year" by the Brazilian telecommunications association Aberimest.
- 2021: he was listed among the top business leaders in the country by Forbes Brasil and received the Marshal Rondon Award from the Brazilian Ministry of Communications. He was named "Best CEO in Latin America" in the Technology, Media & Telecom sector by Institutional Investor and received the "Best CEO in Press Communication" award from Negócios da Comunicação and Cecom.
- 2022: he received the Telco award at the Forbes CEO Awards.
- 2023: he was named "Best CEO - Small & Mid Cap" by Institutional Investor (September) and received the "Rio Leaders Award" from Lide in Brazil.
- 2024: he was named "Best CEO - Small & Mid Cap" by Institutional Investor.
- 2026: he ranked second as best CEO in the European telecommunications sector according to Extel (formerly Institutional Investor).

== Honors ==
Commander of the Order of Rio Branco - ribbon for ordinary uniform

Commander of the Order of Rio Branco
— March 9, 2023
