= Voice recognition =

Voice recognition may refer to:

- Speaker recognition, determining who is speaking
- Speech recognition, determining what is being said
