= Homayoon Beigi =

Iranian-American engineer and researcher

- Born: 1964 (age 61–62); Tehran, Iran
- Education: Columbia University (BS, MS, EngScD)
- Known for: Speaker recognition; Fundamentals of Speaker Recognition; Biometric authentication
- Spouse: Pargol Javaheri-Saatchi
- Awards: IMAC Best Paper Award, Data Science (2026); IMAC Best Paper Award, Dynamics of Civil Structures (2021); Frost & Sullivan North American Speaker Verification Biometrics New Product Innovation Award (2011)
- Scientific career
- Fields: Biometrics; Speaker recognition; Speech recognition; Machine learning; Handwriting recognition; Signal processing; Control systems
- Workplaces: Columbia University; IBM T.J. Watson Research Center; Recognition Technologies, Inc.
- Thesis: Neural network learning and learning control through optimization techniques (1991)
- Doctoral advisor: Richard W. Longman; Ching James Li

Homayoon Beigi is an Iranian-American engineer and researcher specializing in biometrics, speaker recognition, handwriting recognition, machine learning, signal processing, and control systems. He is a professor of Professional Practice in the Departments of electrical engineering and mechanical engineering at Columbia University and the head of research and development at Recognition Technologies, Inc. He is the author of the textbook Fundamentals of Speaker Recognition (2011).

== Early life and education ==
Beigi was born in Tehran in 1964 and lived there until the age of 15. He attended Alborz High School in Tehran through the 9th grade. In a 2018 interview, he said that amid turmoil in Tehran at the onset of the Iranian Revolution, he left Iran for the United States in 1979 to attend The Knox School on Long Island before later entering Columbia University. He attended Columbia University, earning bachelor's and master's degrees in mechanical engineering in 1984 and 1985, followed by a doctorate in the same field in 1991. A 2023 Columbia Engineering alumni note states that he met his wife, Pargol, also a Columbia engineer, while in the doctoral program.

== Career ==
After postdoctoral work at Columbia's Center for Telecommunications Research, Beigi worked at IBM T.J. Watson Research Center from 1991 to 2001, where he worked on multimedia search, speech recognition, speaker recognition, and handwriting recognition.

While at IBM, he co-founded Internet Server Connections, Inc. in 1996. He later became president of Recognition Technologies, Inc., a company focused on biometric software systems. Columbia Engineering profiles describe his later work there as including RecoMadeEasy recognition software and CommerceMadeEasy e-commerce software. In 2011, TMCnet reported that the company's speaker-recognition engine received Frost & Sullivan's North American New Product Innovation Award.

Since 1995, Beigi has taught graduate courses at Columbia University in computer science, electrical engineering, and mechanical engineering. In 2023, he was one of 11 finalists for Columbia University's Presidential Award for Outstanding Teaching. Columbia appointed him Professor of Professional Practice in Electrical Engineering and Mechanical Engineering effective 1 January 2025.

== Research ==
Beigi has published on speaker recognition, speech processing, pattern recognition, and related biometric systems. Columbia Engineering profiles also describe his work as extending to areas such as structural health monitoring, image compression, and financial optimization. He is the author of Fundamentals of Speaker Recognition, published by Springer in 2011. In a 2012 notice, the IEEE Signal Processing Society described the book as suitable both as an advanced textbook and as a reference for developers and speech scientists. His publications also include the encyclopedia entry "Speaker Recognition" in the second edition of Encyclopedia of Cryptography and Security.

He also co-authored the 2011 article "Standard audio format encapsulation (SAFE)". A 2021 paper that he co-authored on transfer learning for structural health monitoring received the best paper award from the Dynamics of Civil Structures technical division at IMAC-XXXIX. A 2026 paper on real-time cross-domain damage detection received the best paper award from the Data Science technical division at IMAC-XLIV. Patent records also list Beigi as inventor on methods for retrieving audio information using content and speaker information and on access control through multifactor authentication with multimodal biometrics. According to Columbia, he has participated in biometrics standards work through ISO/SC37-JTC1-WG3, the VoiceXML Forum, and ANSI/INCITS M1.

== Music and arts ==
Outside of engineering, Beigi has performed Persian classical music with the Noavaran Ensemble and is listed as a co-founder of Artists 4 Peace. Ensemble and event listings identify him as a tar player in New York performances.

== Selected works ==
- Beigi, Homayoon (2011). Fundamentals of Speaker Recognition. Springer. ISBN 978-0-387-77591-3.
- Beigi, Homayoon (2011). "Speaker Recognition". Encyclopedia of Cryptography and Security (2nd ed.). Springer. pp. 1232–1242. doi:10.1007/978-1-4419-5906-5_747.
- Beigi, Homayoon; Markowitz, Judith A. (2011). "Standard audio format encapsulation (SAFE)". Telecommunication Systems. 47 (3–4): 235–242. doi:10.1007/s11235-010-9315-1.
- Tronci, Eleonora M.; Beigi, Homayoon; Feng, Maria Q.; Betti, Raimondo (2022). "Transfer Learning from Audio Domains a Valuable Tool for Structural Health Monitoring". Dynamics of Civil Structures, Volume 2. Conference Proceedings of the Society for Experimental Mechanics Series. Springer. pp. 99–107. doi:10.1007/978-3-030-77143-0_11.
- Viswanathan, Mahesh; Beigi, Homayoon S. M.; Dharanipragada, Satya; Maali, Fereydoun; Tritschler, Alain (2000). "Multimedia document retrieval using speech and speaker recognition". International Journal on Document Analysis and Recognition. 2 (4): 147–162. doi:10.1007/PL00021522.
- Beigi, Homayoon S. M.; Maes, Stéphane H.; Sorensen, Jeffrey S. (1998). "A distance measure between collections of distributions and its application to speaker recognition". Proceedings of the 1998 IEEE International Conference on Acoustics, Speech and Signal Processing (ICASSP). IEEE. pp. 753–756. doi:10.1109/ICASSP.1998.675374.
- Nathan, Krishna S.; Beigi, Homayoon S. M.; Subrahmonia, Jayashree; Clary, Gregory J.; Maruyama, Hiroshi (1995). "Real-time on-line unconstrained handwriting recognition using statistical methods". Proceedings of the 1995 IEEE International Conference on Acoustics, Speech, and Signal Processing (ICASSP). IEEE. pp. 2619–2622. doi:10.1109/ICASSP.1995.480098.
