= .sm =

Internet country code top-level domain for San Marino

- Introduced: 16 August 1995
- TLD type: Country code top-level domain
- Status: Active
- Registry: NIC.sm (Telecom Italia San Marino)
- Sponsor: Telecom Italia San Marino
- Intended use: Entities connected with San Marino
- Actual use: Some use in San Marino; occasional use as a domain hack
- Registration restrictions: Companies limited to 50 domain registrations per year; individuals and other organizations to one registration in total
- Structure: Names can be registered directly at second level
- Documents: Regulations
- Dispute policies: None
- Registry website: www.nic.sm

.sm is the Internet country code top-level domain (ccTLD) for San Marino.

The domain is administered by the Office of Information Technology, Data and Statistics and managed by Telecom Italia San Marino.

The domain is occasionally used as a domain hack for sites ending in the -ism suffix.
