= Miro Allione =

Italian executive, professor and writer

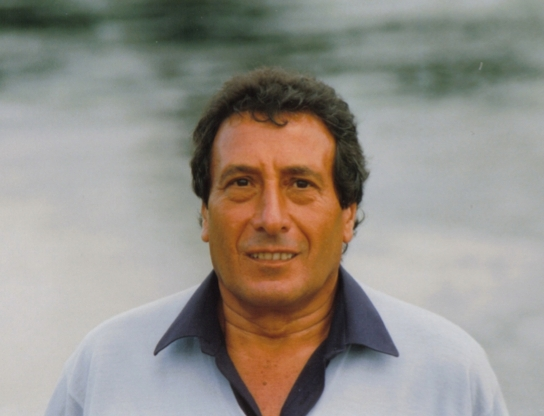
- Born: Admiro Allione; 20 December 1932; Milan, Italy
- Died: January 14, 2006 (aged 73); Rome, Italy
- Known for: Managing director of STET; Founder, president and CEO of Stream
- Title: Professor of Mathematics
- Spouses: Unknown first wife; Anna Maramao (1992-2006)
- Children: 2 with the first wife, 1 with the second wife.
- Parent: Abramo Allione (father)

Admiro (Miro) Allione (December 20, 1932 – January 14, 2006) was an Italian executive who served as managing director of STET and was founder, President and CEO of Stream.

Before being involved in telecommunications, he was a professor of Mathematics and Urban Planning. He also wrote many books about economics and mathematics.

== Biography ==
Miro Allione was born 20 December 1932 in Milan. He was the first son of Abramo Allione, an Italian composer, publisher and record producer. The name "Admiro" was mistakenly registered at the local register office and was never changed to "Miro", the name that he always used.

He graduated at university in Mathematics and Economics in 1961 and then started a career as a Mathematics professor, also writing economic essays and books.

In 1984 he entered the STET, a leading Italian telecommunications company. Then in the 1990 he is promoted to managing director of the company.

In 1993 he left the STET to create Stream S.P.A., a television company service provider of Stream TV, that will become the second Pay TV in Italy, until the fusion with TELE+ and the creation of SKY Italia. He served as President and CEO of Stream until 1999.

In 1999, after leaving Stream S.P.A. he joined the Board of Directors of Systeam S.P.A., an Italian company based on e-systems integrators with an extensive portfolio of blue chip clients.

Form 2001 he was the CEO of Marine Contractor, a company working for Fincantieri in the construction of cruise ships.

During his life he wrote books, some essays, many articles on journals (in particular on il manifesto) and specialized magazines, covering mathematics, economics, and tele-communications themes. He was also often interviewed on radios (such as Radio Radicale) and television about those topics.

=== Personal life ===
Miro Allione had two sons from his first marriage, Sandro and Andrea. After the divorce from his first wife, he married Anna Maramao on 16 April 1992, with whom he had another son named Marco.

He was a great lover of tennis, a sport he practiced very often, even participating in some amateur tournaments. In particular he is remembered to winning a Maserati Biturbo Spyder (Tipo AM333) at the 1991 tournament of the Società Ginnastica Roma.

He died in Rome in January 2006 after staying several months in hospital. After the cremation, his ashes were scattered in the woods near Orvieto, an area of Umbria that he loved very much in the last years of his life and where he owned a country house with his wife Anna Maramao.

== Related voices ==
- STET – Società Finanziaria Telefonica
- Stream TV
- Pay television
