= Connected speech =

Continuous sequence of sounds in spoken language

In linguistics, connected speech or connected discourse is a continuous sequence of sounds forming utterances or conversations in spoken language. Analysis of connected speech shows sound changes affecting linguistic units traditionally described as phrases, words, lexemes, morphemes, syllables, phonemes or phones. The words that are modified by those rules will sound differently in connected speech than in citation form (canonical form or isolation form).

Types of connected speech principles include:

1. Coalescence
2. Lenition
3. Elision
4. Epenthesis
5. Assimilation
6. Linking (Liaison)
7. Juncture

== See also ==
- Morphophonology
- Phonology
- Prosody (linguistics)
- RIPAC (microprocessor)
- Sandhi
