= Grégory Allione =

French politician (born 1971)

Grégory Allione MEP
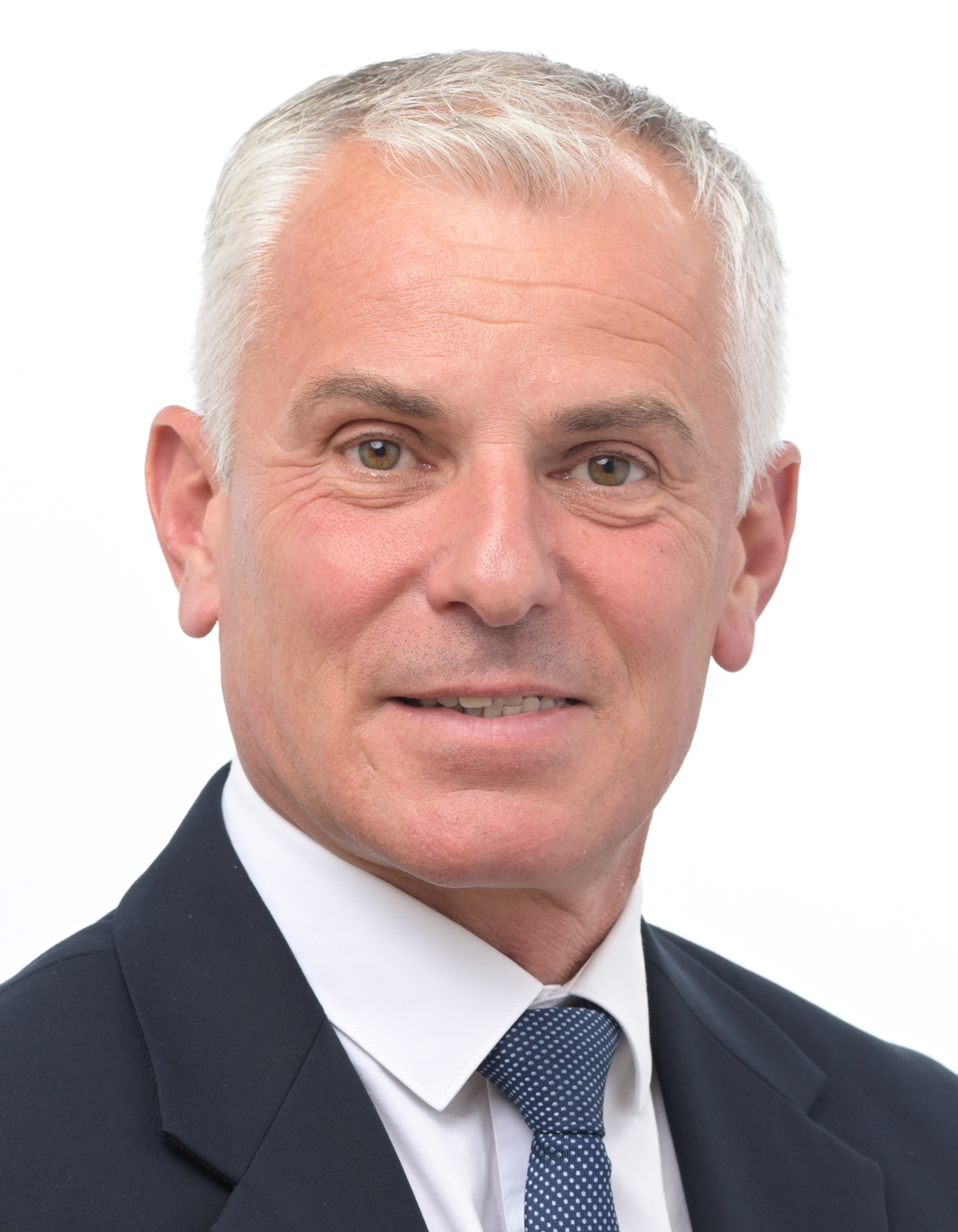

Member of the European Parliament for France
- Incumbent
- Assumed office 16 July 2024

Personal details
- Born: 25 July 1971 (age 54)
- Party: Independent
- Other political affiliations: Alliance of Liberals and Democrats for Europe Party

Grégory Allione (born 25 July 1971) is a French firefighter and politician who was elected member of the European Parliament in 2024.

== Career ==
Allione was born in Toulon in 1971, and has been a firefighter since the age of 17. He was head of the fire brigade in Bouches-du-Rhône from 2014 to 2023, and was named president of the National Federation of French Firefighters in 2018. Until his election to the European Parliament, he served as director of ENSOSP.
