= Società Finanziaria Telefonica =

STET - Società Finanziaria Telefonica S.p.A.
- Type: state-owned company
- Industry: Telecommunication
- Founded: 21 October 1933
- Defunct: 31 July 1997
- Successor: Telecom Italia
- Headquarters: Turin and Rome, Italy
- Area served: Nationwide
- Net income: 33 billion (lira) in 1994
- Owner: IRI
- Number of employees: 133,000 (in 1994)
- Subsidiaries: Stream

Società Finanziaria Telefonica (STET, English: Telephonic Financial Company) was an Italian company that operated in the telecommunications sector. It was IRI's holding company for this sector.

== History ==
STET was founded by IRI on October 21, 1933 as the STET – Società Torinese per l'Esercizio Telefonico and was based in Turin with headquarters in Rome. The aim of the company was to address technical, administrative and accounting of all state's company for telephone services and for public telecommunications services in Italy.

In 1964 fostered the born of the research center CSELT to modernize the Italian phone service, and in 1976 the campus of Scuola Superiore Guglielmo Reiss Romoli was built in L'Aquila to support training activities for managers and executives of the group. In the late 60s the group company Selenia produced the first European minicomputer: the Selenia Gp-16.

In 1992, with the privatization carried out by first Amato government the company was renamed as "STET - Società Finanziaria Telefonica S.p.A".

In 1993, STET's managing director Miro Allione left the company to create Stream, which became one of the largest pay TV and digital satellite television networks in Italy.

In 1997 STET is merged with Telecom Italia, together with Telespazio and Italcable: the new company will be named Telecom Italia S.p.A., at the same time of the resignment of Ernesto Pascale, a STET's managing director and key person for the company.

== See also ==
- Telecom Italia
- Stream TV
- Istituto per la Ricostruzione Industriale
