= Vidby =

AI-based language translator for videos

Vidby AG
- Company type: Aktiengesellschaft
- Industry: Technology
- Predecessor: DROTR (Droid Translator)
- Founded: 2021; 5 years ago in Rotkreuz
- Founder: Alexander Konovalov, Eugen von Rubinberg
- Headquarters: Rotkreuz (canton of Zug), Switzerland
- Website: https://vidby.com/

Vidby AG (stylized in lower-case) is a start-up based in Rotkreuz, Switzerland specializing in AI language translation for videos. Founded by Alexander Konovalov (uk:Олександр Коновалов) and Eugen von Rubinberg in September 2021, the company has especially garnered attention for its use in translating speeches given by President Volodymyr Zelenskyy during the Russian invasion of Ukraine.

== History ==
Vidby AG was founded by Alexander Konovalov and Eugen von Rubinberg. Konovalov is a native of Ukraine and retains Ukrainian citizenship; Rubinberg came to Switzerland from Germany and holds German citizenship. Both are residents of Switzerland. The latter founded his first business, a trading company, at age 16.

In 2013, the business partners launched a consumer-oriented video-call translation service called DROTR (Droid Translator) AG, utilizing a Konovalov-created AI-powered language translation technology enabling simultaneous translation of messages, voice and video calls in 104 languages (written), with 44 available in spoken form. This was the world's first video calling app with translation. The technology was pronounced a competitor of Skype and Viber by Forbes and claimed first prize at the "Innovative Breakthrough 2013" Competition.

In 2021, with a new business-oriented focus, DROTR became Vidby, with the former Google technology partners Konovalov and Rubinberg remaining at the helm, each with the title Co-CEO. While headquartered in Switzerland, Vidby's development team is, according to the company's founders, based in Ukraine. The technology behind Vidby has an accuracy level variously reported as up to 99 percent or 99 to 100 percent, equalling the highest level of human translation. Additionally, the technology is capable of removing the original language while maintaining ambient sounds. Currently, some 70 languages plus 60 dialects are possible with the algorithm-based technology.

== Notable use ==
In addition to its use with speeches delivered by Pope Francis, the technology has been provided to Ukrainian authorities and embassies during the ongoing military conflict with Russia free of remuneration. By July, 2022, some 70 speeches given by President Zelenskyy totalling 650 minutes had been translated into 30 languages, for a total of over 10,000 minutes of video material. Of its use in translating Zelenskyy's wartime speeches, Konovalov has said, "Like any citizen, I want to help defend my country."

Notable corporate clients of Vidby include Samsung, Siemens, Cisco, Kärcher, Generali and McDonald's Corporation; an academic client is Harvard University.

Google Cloud Technology Partner status of Vidby was confirmed officially after a six-month audit in December 2022.

Denys Krasnikov, a Vidby co-founder, is responsible for cooperation with Google, YouTube, Microsoft, and other key partners. After the launch of multilingual YouTube channels, Vidby started AI translating and dubbing creators' videos for this new type of channel at the end of February 2023.

== Accolades ==
Vidby headed a list of the five best video translation services as named by TechRadar Deutschland in September, 2022. In the same month, Tech Times named Vidby #1 in their list of the five best such services. It similarly topped a list of the five best content translation technologies as judged by European Business Review in October, 2022. Prior to these lead-position rankings (August, 2022), it was featured as Business Insider's special start-up recommendation (German: "Unser Lesetipp auf Gründerszene").

In 2023, YouTube recognized Vidby as its recommended vendor.

== See also ==
- Machine translation
- Speech recognition
