= TIM Group =

Italian telecommunications company

TIM S.p.A.

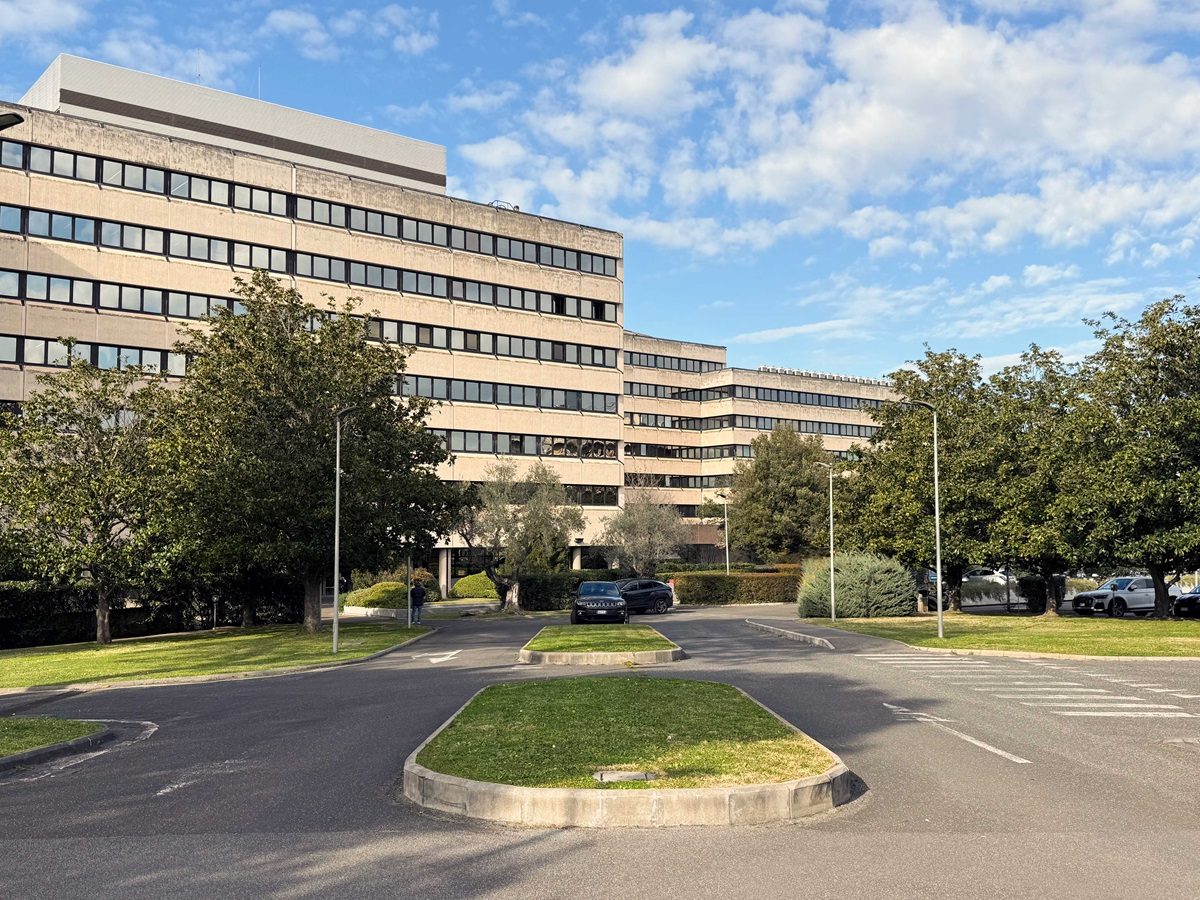
- TIM Group's headquarters in Rome, Italy
- Trade name: TIM S.p.A. (2016–present)
- Formerly: Telecom Italia S.p.A. (1994–2016)
- Type: Public
- Traded as: BIT: TIT; BIT: TITR; FTSE MIB
- ISIN: IT0003497168; IT0003497176
- Industry: Telecommunications
- Predecessor: SIP
- Founded: 27 July 1994; 32 years ago
- Founder: IRI
- Headquarters: Rome, Milan, Bari and Naples, Italy
- Area served: Italy, San Marino, Brazil
- Key people: Pietro Labriola (CEO); Alberta Figari (Chairwoman)
- Products: Fixed telephony; Public telephony; Mobile telephony; Broadband Internet; IT Services; Networking solutions; Digital television
- Revenue: ▼€14.442 billion (2024)
- Net income: ▲€−364 million (2024)
- Total assets: ▼€37.67 billion (2024)
- Total equity: ▼€13.36 billion (2024)
- Owners: Poste Italiane (24.81%)
- Number of employees: ▼51,929 (end 2021)
- Subsidiaries: List: Telecom Italia Capital (100%); Telecom Italia Finance (100%); Telecom Italia Lab (100%); TIM Brasil (100%); TIM San Marino (100%); Telefonia Mobile Sammarinese (51%); Telecom Italia Trust Technologies (100%); Telsy (100%); FiberCop (58%); Nòverca (100%); Olivetti (100%); Persidera (70%); INWIT (37.513%); Telecom Italia Sparkle (100%)
- Website: www.gruppotim.it

TIM S.p.A., (formerly known as Telecom Italia S.p.A.), is an Italian multinational telecommunications company with headquarters in Rome, Milan, Bari, and Naples (with the Telecom Italia Tower), which provides fixed, public and mobile telephony, and DSL data services.

It is the largest Italian telecommunications services provider in revenues and subscribers. It was founded in 1994 by the merger of several state-owned telecommunications companies, the most prominent of which was SIP, the former state monopoly telephone operator in Italy.

The company's stock is traded in the Borsa Italiana. The Italian State has exercised the "Golden Power" on TIM since 2017, which allows the government to take a number of actions when the strategic interests of the country are concerned.

It has also a subsidiary in Brazil, known as TIM Brasil, with 72.6 million customers. The brand covers over 114 million customers worldwide.

As April 2024, Net sales are distributed geographically as follows: Italy (72.9%) and Brazil (27.1%).

== History ==
=== Origins ===
In 1925, the Italian phone network was reorganised by the Benito Mussolini cabinet and the company STIPEL was established in the same year. The original core of Telecom Italia included four companies which operated in a specific geographical area: TIMO, TE.TI., TELVE and SET.

In 1964, Società Idroelettrica Piemontese (SIP), a former energy company founded in 1918, ceased producing energy and acquired all of the Italian telephone companies, becoming Società Italiana per l'Esercizio Telefonico. It was run by the Italian Ministry of Finance. SIP was a state monopoly from 1964 to 1996 and Italian people had to pay the "Canone Telecom" (a line rental charge) in order to have a phone at home.

=== 1994–2005: Telecom Italia, Telecom Italia Mobile and DSL services ===
The first appearance in the Italian mobile telephony market dates back to 1990 with the launch of the TACS network by the Telecom Italia Mobile Radio Services division.

Telecom Italia was officially created on 27 July 1994 by the merge of several telecommunications companies, including SIP, IRITEL, Italcable, Telespazio and SIRM (companies owned by STET). This was due to a reorganization plan for the telecommunications sector presented by Istituto per la Ricostruzione Industriale (IRI) to the Minister of Finance.

In 1995, the mobile telephony division was spun off as Telecom Italia Mobile (TIM), while Telecom Italia, under managing director Francesco Chirichigno, would take care of fixed and public telephony and network infrastructure. On 7 October, after the experimentation period at the CSELT, TIM launched the first rechargeable prepaid card for Italy, the TIM Card, becoming the first telephone company in the world to introduce this charging system. Towards the end of 1996 TIM was the first world operator to launch a tariff plan based on a prepaid card on the GSM network, which in a short time generated rapid growth in mobile telephony. Interbusiness, Italy's largest internet network, was created and in the same period with Telecom Italia Net (Tin.it) and the first internet service providers (ISPs), internet access became a reality in Italy. In 1996, TIM introduced a new prepaid rechargeable phone card (GSM), and one year later launched short messaging service (SMS) capability.

In 1997, under the chairmanship of Guido Rossi, Telecom Italia was privatised and was transformed into a large multimedia group.

By 2001, the company was in debt and was acquired by Marco Tronchetti Provera. In April 2001 it launched its first ADSL service for consumers with a download speed of 256 kbit/s and an upload speed of 128 kbit/s. The following year, the group released its DSL Flat service in Italy, Alice ADSL, with WiFi and a download speed of 256 kbit/s and an upload speed of 128 kbit/s for €40/month plus a monthly based tax of €14.57, the "Canone Telecom", besides the mandatory monthly bills for home telephone numbers (a home telephone number was required for ADSL service). Telecom Italia Media, the group's multimedia company, was formed in 2003 from SEAT Pagine Gialle, focussing its business on the television sector with La7 and MTV channels.

After the reorganization of editorial activities, Telecom Italia acquired Tin.it and Virgilio from Telecom Italia Media in 2005 .

The Telecom Italia Group also operates in South America; in Brazil as TIM Brasil, and in Argentina and Paraguay with Telecom Argentina. TIM Brasil has its local headquarters in Rio de Janeiro. Telecom Italia also had a 50% share in the Bolivian telecommunications company Entel until its share was nationalised by the Bolivian government in 2008.

In 2002, TIM was the first mobile telecommunications company in Europe to launch MMS services. Between 2002 and 2004, it launched some value-added services: SMS and MMS content, Internet browsing using WAP technology, games and Java applications.

In 2003, the world's first mobile television service was launched, exploiting the video playback capabilities appearing on mobile terminals in that period and, again in 2003, it stipulated an international roaming agreement, similar to that of Vodafone, with operators world's leading mobile (T-Mobile, Orange and TeliaSonera). This alliance will be called FreeMove.

In 2004, as part of the TIM Turbo project, the EDGE and UMTS services were created for high-speed data transmission.

=== 2005–2014: Telecom Italia acquired by Telefónica ===
In 2005, the first Italian mobile community, TIM Tribù, was formed.

In June 2005, TIM merged into Telecom Italia, remaining active as brand for Telecom Italia's mobile telephony offer.

Telecom Italia reported mounting debts in 2005, and, one year later, CEO Marco Tronchetti Provera resigned.

In 2007 the company was bought by Telco, a consortium of Telefónica and several Italian banks. Telefónica owned 46% of Telco, the holding company that controlled 22% of Telecom Italia.

In December 2011, the company developed TIM Cloud, a cloud storage service dedicated to its customers where they can save digital files.

In November 2012, TIM launched its LTE network.

The TIM Wallet service was born in February 2013, to be able to make payments via smartphone thanks to NFC technology.

In late 2013, Telefónica announced its intention to acquire the entirety of Telco by January 2014, potentially becoming Telecom Italia's largest shareholder. The plan, however, is being challenged by the Brazilian competition authority since Telefónica and Telecom Italia, with Vivo and TIM respectively, are the two largest telephone companies competing in Brazil.

In 2014, multimedia entertainment services were launched through the TIMgames, TIMmusic, TIMreading and TIMvision applications.

=== 2015: Rebrand ===
In 2015, the company started a rebranding process towards the unified TIM brand, which would no longer be used only to identify mobile telephony offers but also for fixed telephony ones, abandoning the Telecom Italia brand. In the same year, the board of directors approved the new company's division, Infrastrutture Wireless Italiane (INWIT) which operates 11,500 wireless towers.

TIM was the Official Global Partner of Expo 2015. Thanks to the company's contribution, it was possible to create the first Italian digital smart city, directly in the exhibition area. TIM has in fact equipped the entire area with technological solutions, fixed network, mobile and Internet infrastructures and coverage of the exhibition site with fixed and mobile ultra-broadband connections and Wi-Fi connections based on Cisco technology.

=== 2015–2018: Vivendi ===
It was revealed in October 2015 that shareholders Vivendi would raise their stakes further in the company from its current level of 15.49%. As of May 2017, Vivendi owns 24.6% of the company with Vivendi's CEO Arnaud de Puyfontaine becoming executive chairman of Telecom Italia. Amos Genish is the new CEO since 28 September 2017 and he has been criticized to have fired 4500 Telecom Italia employees in June 2018. He has been substituted by Luigi Gubitosi, who became the new CEO on 18 November 2018.

In 2016, following the rebranding that led to the adoption of the single TIM brand, the parent company also decided to change its identity. The company name of Telecom Italia it was in fact changed to TIM Group, however still maintaining the previous name on some occasions.

=== 2023–2024: the spin-off of NetCo ===
On 12 June 2024 Moody's improves its rating on TIM, raising it to Ba3 from B1.

On 1 July 2024 the transfer of the network to KKR took place, with a debt reduction of €22 billion. The operation values the network at a total of €18.8 billion, expandable up to 22 billion with the earn outs also linked to the possible merger between NetCo and Open Fiber.

On 9 July 2024, S&P, after the sale of the network to the KKR, promoted the TIM Group to BB from the previous B+, with the outlook remaining stable.

On 31 July 2024, Tim presented its half-yearly results, with a debt that after the sale of the network settles at €8.1 billion, with a further reduction of 0.6 billion expected for the end of the year. TIM had a turnover of €7.1 billion (+3.5%) and an EBITDA of 2.1 (+9.4%). Fitch, following Moody's and S&P, upgraded the rating to BB with a stable outlook.

On 19 August 2024, TIM announces a partnership with Nokia to enhance the 5G mobile network in Brazil.

On 2 October 2024, TIM examines the proposal formulated by the Italian Ministry of Economy and Finance together with the Asterion fund for the purchase of the entire share of Sparkle. TIM would thus conclude the debt restructuring process by collecting an additional €700 million.

On 23 October 2024, corruption charges are formulated by the Guardia di Finanza and the Rome Prosecutor's Office against the director Simone De Rose, head of the Procurement function office of TIM Group and Emilio Graziano, manager of NTT Data Italia. TIM immediately appoints a new manager, Giampaolo Leone. TIM evaluates a request for compensation for damages to the dishonest employee and collaborates with the Guardia di Finanza inspectors in the investigation.

On 5 November 2024, the subsidiary TIM Brasil has continued to show strong growth in revenues and profits, confirming itself as a strong cash flow generator for the group.

On 13 November 2024, TIM Group published Q3/9M 2024 Financial Results. TIM Group has revenues growing to €10.7 billion with gross operating margin rising to €2.7 billion, while Tim's adjusted net financial debt after lease is €8.0 billion.

On 17 December 2024, CVC Capital Partners is evaluating the purchase of Vivendi's entire stake in Telecom Italia and the stock rises by 5.7%.

=== 2025: Poste Italiane and the sale of Sparkle ===
On 13 January 2025, the Milan court rejected the appeal presented by Vivendi against the board of directors for the sale of TIM's network. On 15 January 2025, TIM's board of directors discussed the offer presented by the Ministry of Economy and Finance and Retelit for the sale of Sparkle. The proposed offer is approximately 700 million euros for full control of Sparkle. Furthermore, 20 January 2025 is also the deadline for TIM to negotiate with the Italian government an agreement on the refund of the 1998 license fee, an agreement worth hundreds of millions of euros. If both deals go through, there could be a further €1.8 billion cut in TIM's already reduced debt. On 15 January 2025, the stock closed the trading day with a +0.47% at a price of €0.258, confirming a bullish trend that takes it away from the minimum values reached last year. On 12 February 2025, Tim Group presents the 2024 financial statements with growing profits and approves the sale of Sparkle for 700 million which will be completed during the year. It also communicates the postponement of share dividends to 2026.

==== Share swap between Cdp and Poste Italiane ====
On 17 February 2025, there is a share exchange with Poste Italiane of the share held by Cdp, in this way Poste Italiane becomes a shareholder of Tim and Cdp exits totally from the share capital of Tim with a cash consideration and Nexi shares. Poste Italiane is not only a major shareholder, but also a strategic partner of Tim, in the Italian Government's view of protecting and strengthening Tim as an important Italian asset. On 5 March 2025, Tim Group presents improving financial data with after-lease debt at 7,266 million euros.

==== Vivendi reduces its stake in the share capital ====
Starting from 18 March 2025, Vivendi will progressively reduce its stake in the share capital from 23.75% to 18.4%. On 21 March 2025, this reduction of the share is communicated to CONSOB. On 28 March 2025, Poste Italiane buys 15% of Tim from the share held by Vivendi and increases the previous share held to 24.8%. The portion of the shares purchased by Poste Italiane cost approximately 684 million at 0.2975 euros per share. With this stock transaction, Poste Italiane becomes the majority shareholder of TIM Group.

==== Poste Italiane majority shareholder ====
As April 2025, Poste Italiane holds a 24.81% majority stake in TIM Group, while Vivendi's share has shrunk to 2.5%. On 14 April 2025, the sale of Sparkle to the MEF-Retelit consortium is completed. The transaction is expected to be concluded by the last quarter of 2025. On 24 June 2025, the 2024 financial statements were approved at the company meeting, and the company's corporate purpose was expanded. On 11 December 2025, Poste Italiane acquired Vivandi's remaining stake in Tim, increasing its stake to 27.32%.

==== Refund of the Government Concession Fee ====
On 20 December 2025, the Supreme Court of Cassation has confirmed the refund of the concession fee claimed for 1998, thus ending a dispute that had lasted over 20 years. The amount owed is equal to the original fee, just over €500 million, plus revaluation and accrued interest, for a total of just over €1 billion.

==== Corporate and shares improving ====
On 21 December 2025, extraordinary operations aimed at improving the company's corporate and shareholder structure are announced. Specifically, savings shares are converted into ordinary shares, guaranteeing shareholders a profit for participating in the transaction. Furthermore, the reinstatement of dividends on ordinary shares is announced. On 28 January 2026, the shareholders' meeting approved the conversion of savings shares into ordinary shares almost unanimously. Savings shareholders who opt for the optional conversion will receive one ordinary share and a cash payment of €0.12 for each savings share delivered. Those who opt for the mandatory conversion will receive one ordinary share and a cash payment of €0.04. Furthermore, a voluntary reduction in share capital from €11.79 billion to €6 billion was approved, with the difference allocated to the legal reserve and available equity reserve. These extraordinary operations consolidated the rise in the stock price.

== Main shareholders ==
The main shareholders of TIM Group on 12 October 2026 are:

Name	%
Poste Italiane	85.82 %
Public float	14.18 %

== Controversy ==
=== Fraud in Brazilian prepaid mobile lines ===
On 8 August 2012, TIM Brasil became involved in a massive scandal in Brazilian news after the release of report by the Brazilian National Telecommunications Agency Anatel.

The report points that on TIM's prepaid voice plan (24.7% market share), called "Infinity" (in which the user pays roughly US$0.12 for each unlimited time call), the calls were intentionally dropped by the company, forcing the customers to make (and pay for) new calls to keep talking. In just one day, 8.1 million calls were dropped and the total profit was approximately $2 million. Upon release of the report, the Public Ministry of the Paraná State filed a lawsuit against TIM asking that it stop selling new mobile lines in Brasil and pay a multimillion-dollar fine for the damages against consumers.

In 2013, TIM was accused by consumers of unfair practices, such as charging €4 with a particular New Flat Day Free tariff.

== Operations ==
The Telecom Italia Group provides phone landline services and mobile services in Italy, GSM mobile phone services in Italy and Brazil through its TIM and TIM Brasil subsidiaries, and DSL Internet and telephony services in Italy and San Marino (through Telecom Italia San Marino). It also operates in international telecommunications services for other operators and corporations, through its subsidiary Telecom Italia Sparkle. In 2013, the total amount of the company's debt was about 26 billion €. Telecom Italia has 66,025 employees.

Telecom Italia also controls Olivetti, a manufacturer of computer peripherals and mobile phones. On 31 March 2014, Telecom Italia led both the direct fixed access lines market with a 62% share, and the mobile postpaid segment with a 45% market share. In the mobile "prepaid" segment Telecom Italia owned a 31.5% market share together with Vodafone.

After the merger of 3 Italy and Wind, completed on 31 December 2016 with the born of Wind Tre, Telecom Italia is now the country's second largest carrier with 30 million customers, followed by Vodafone with 25 million customers. Telecom Italia has preserved its leadership on the direct fixed access lines market and the mobile postpaid segment.

=== High debt issue ===
The high accumulated debt was mainly due to the 1999 takeover bid carried out by Roberto Colaninno, who acquired the company and subsequently offloaded the purchase costs onto the company itself. Moody rated the debt with a B1 grade negative outlook in 2015. Telecom Italia S.p.A. deals with a total debt of €27 billion as of the end of 2019. As of the end of 2023, the net financial debt after lease for the TIM Group stood at €20.3 billion. Additionally, the adjusted net financial debt was €25.7 billion.

=== Removing high debt ===
On 1 July 2024, with the finalization of the sale of the network to KKR, the debt was reduced by €22 billion. So TIM Group no longer has high debt. The remaining debt is in sharp reduction. Less than €7.5 billion by the end of 2024.

== Environmental practices and initiatives ==
In 2002, Telecom Italia subscribed to the United Nations corporate responsibility initiative Global Compact. It is also member of a number of stock market indexes which include companies focused on corporate social responsibility, including the Dow Jones Sustainability Indexes and those administered by FTSE Group's FTSE4Good. Its part-owned Brazilian subsidiary, TIM Brasil, is listed in the Bovespa's ISE (Índice de Sustentabilidade Empresarial) index.

Telecom Italia promotes a sustainability strategy including both environmental and social issues: in June 2014 it signed an agreement with A2A to buy energy only from renewable sources.

== Logo history ==
=== Telecom Italia ===
1994–2003

2003–2016

2016–2019

2019–present

=== TIM ===
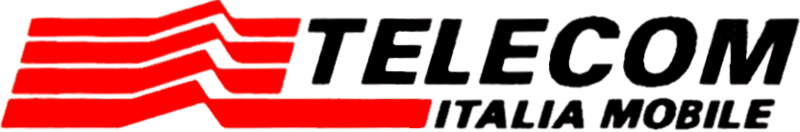
1990–1995

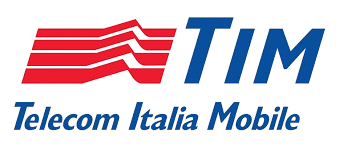
1995–1998

1999–2004

2004–2014

2014–2016

2016–present

== See also ==
- List of mobile network operators in Italy
- Infrastrutture Wireless Italiane
- STET – Società Finanziaria Telefonica
- Telecom Italia San Marino
- Telecom Italia Tower (Naples)
- TIM Brasil
- TIMvision
