= CSELT =

Telecoms research institute in Italy

Telecom Italia Lab S.p.A.
- Formerly: Centro Studi e Laboratori S.p.A. (1961–1964); Centro Studi e Laboratori Telecomunicazioni S.p.A. (1964–2001)
- Type: Subsidiary
- Industry: Telecommunications
- Founded: 1961; 65 years ago
- Founder: STIPEL
- Headquarters: Turin, Italy
- Area served: Worldwide
- Key people: Luigi Bonavoglia; Basilio Catania; Cesare Mossotto
- Net income: 150k Euro (2000)
- Owner: IRI-STET (until the 1990s), Telecom Italia (since the 1990s)
- Number of employees: 1200 (in 2000)
- Parent: IRI
- Divisions: Voice Technologies, Media Technologies, Fiber Optics Technologies

Telecom Italia Lab S.p.A. (formerly Centro Studi e Laboratori Telecomunicazioni S.p.A.; CSELT) is an Italian research center for telecommunication based in Turin, the biggest in Italy and one of the most important in Europe.

It played a major role internationally especially in the standardization of protocols and technologies in telecommunication: perhaps the most widely well known is the standardization of mp3.

CSELT has been active from 1964 to 2001, initially as a part of the IRI-STET group, the major conglomerate of Italian public Industries in the 1960s and 1970s; it later became part of Telecom Italia Group. In 2001, it was renamed Telecom Italia Lab as part of Telecom Italia Group.

== Research areas ==
=== Transmission technology and fiber optics ===
CSELT became internationally known at the end of 1960s thanks to a cooperation with the US-based company COMSAT for a pilot project of TDMA (and PCM) satellite communication system. Furthermore, in 1971 it started a joint research with Corning Glass Works on optical fiber cables: as a result, in 1977 Turin was the first city having a metropolitan optic line (9 km of length, the longest at that time), in collaboration with Sirti and Pirelli. An example of innovation in the fiber optics field, was the coupling techniques of the optic cables, named Springroove and patented in 1977 by CSELT, that allowed to build long paths of optic fibers suitable for a metropolitan network.

=== Computer science ===
In 1971, CSELT built the "Gruppi Speciali", a time-division processing computer for telephone call switching. It was the second electronic switching system in Europe, following Britain's 1968 Empress, but it was very advanced in its design: e.g. in 1975 was introduced for the first time an architecture-independent automatic bootstrap from ROM composed from semiconductors, pushing a single button (and not by a long hand procedure input as in the past) and with the storage of the machine state of the switch, in order to have a quick automatic reboot of the switch in case of failure.

=== Image processing: the Shroud of Turin ===
In 1978, CSELT also gained notoriety due to its 3D images of the Shroud of Turin, supervised by Giovanni Tamburelli: those images, the highest-resolution ones available at that time, followed the first 3D images of the Shroud that had been provided by NASA earlier during the same year. Notably, that work made the native "3D structure" of the Shroud itself apparent for the first time. A second result from Tamburelli was the electronic removal from the image of what was term "blood" covering the man of the Shroud.

=== Speech technologies ===
1975 saw the release of MUSA, the first Italian speech synthezer, and one of the first in the world: later, the same group also contributed to research in speech recognition: both technologies were used for auto-responder systems in telco services. Since 1975 the group of Voice Technology, led by Giulio Modena, carried on the advanced researchers in the field, publishing for Springer (together with the consortium of Esprit project) the book in 1990: Pirani, Giancarlo, ed. Advanced algorithms and architectures for speech understanding. Vol. 1. Springer Science & Business Media, 1990. Later, this work was transferred to the spin-off company Loquendo SpA. Starting from 1978, MUSA was able to sing Fra Martino Campanaro in Italian. At that time that was the only speech synthesis system of commercial interest available on the market apart the one provided by AT&T. and the only one able to speak and sing in Italian.

=== The Audio-Video encoding Group ===
At the end of the 1980s, Dr. Leonardo Chiariglione, Vice-President of the Media Group at CSELT, founded and chaired the international MPEG group, that released and test audio-video standards such as MPEG-1, MP3, MPEG-4 in cooperation with several companies worldwide: in March 1992 a working MPEG-1 system was demonstrated in CSELT. Work on image compression standards (such as JPEG) was also undertaken. All these innovations had a strong impact on media technology on a worldwide scale.

== The last years ==
Several researches were carried also on later years in the field of optics circuits, microprocessor, antennas and all the fields of telecommunication as member of international standard group, such as W3C. In 1996 (with Telecom Italia Mobile) the first GSM pre-paid card in the world was released, and in 1999 the first UMTS call in a European city was tested.

In March 2001 CSELT was merged by incorporation in Telecom Italia Lab (TI Lab), a new S.p.A. 100% owned by Telecom Italia, when the successful speech and voice research group was spun off as Loquendo in January 2001, later (2011) sold to Nuance Communications. TILab combined part of the former CSELT with Venture Capital and Business Units.

== Awards and recognition ==
- In 1988, CSELT was awarded the Eurotelecom Prize by Juan Carlos I for being "one of the main architects of the Race program for advanced technologies for telecommunications in Europe".
- CSELT won the Telework Award, the first prize of the European Telework Week 1998, because of the experimental demonstration of the usefulness of CSELT technologies for disabled users, such as quadriplegics or blind people, with the combination of different voice technologies (remarkable for their high quality).

== Gallery ==
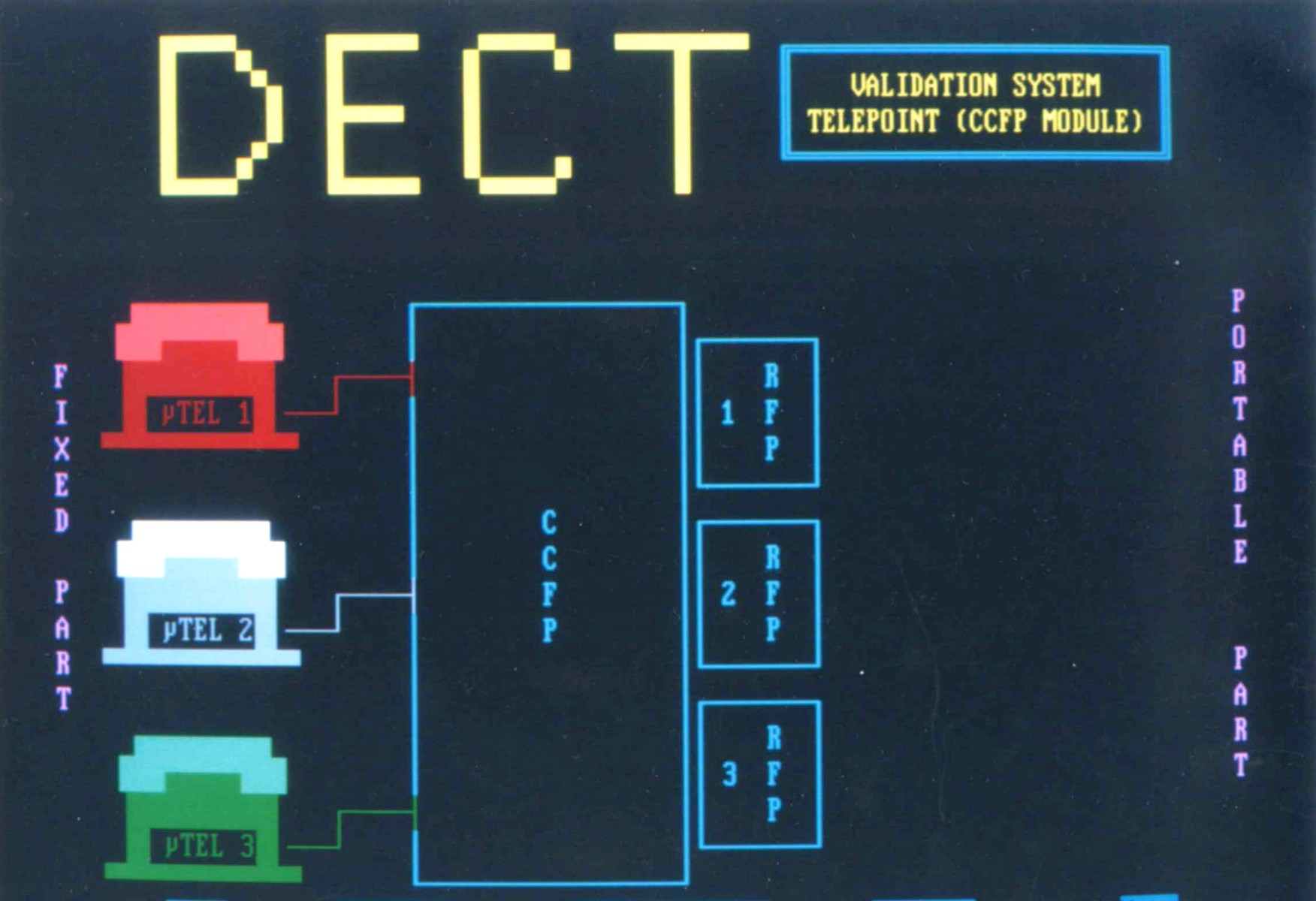
Processor built at CSELT, Turin.

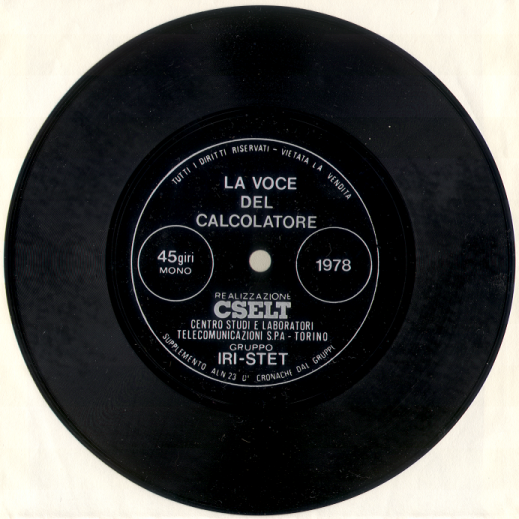
Audio disk containing "Fra Martino campanaro" sung by MUSA

== Bibliography ==
- Pirani, Giancarlo, ed. (2013). Advanced algorithms and architectures for speech understanding. Vol. 1. Springer Science & Business Media.
- Llerena, Patrick; Matt, Mireille, eds. (2005). Innovation policy in a knowledge-based economy : theory and practice. Berlin: Springer. ISBN 978-3540255819.
- Saracco, Roberto (2000). The disappearance of telecommunications. New York: IEEE Press. ISBN 9780780353879.

== Bibliography about CSELT ==
- Bonavoglia, Luigi (1994). CSELT trent'anni (PDF) (in Italian). Turin: Ed. CSELT. ISBN 0262533294.
- Antonelli, Cristiano; Lamborghini, Bruno (1978). Impresa pubblica e tecnologie avanzate: il caso della STET nell'elettronica (in Italian). Bologna: Il Mulino.
- Bottiglieri, Bruno (1990). SIP. Impresa, tecnologia e Stato nelle telecomunicazioni italiane (in Italian). Franco Angeli. ISBN 88-204-3752-X.
- Cesare Mossotto (2011). "Centro studi e laboratori telecomunicazioni (CSELT)". In Cantoni, Virginio; Falciasecca, Gabriele; Pelosi, Giuseppe (eds.). Storia delle telecomunicazioni, Vol. 1 (in Italian). Firenze University Press. pp. 347–403. ISBN 978-88-6453-243-1.
- Piccaluga, Andrea (2002). La valorizzazione della ricerca scientifica. Come cambia la ricerca pubblica e quella industriale (in Italian). Milan: Ed. Franco Angeli. ISBN 978-88-464-3153-0.
