= FTSE Italia All-Share =

Italian stock market index

The FTSE Italia All-Share is a stock market index of Borsa Italiana, the main stock exchange of Italy. Calculated by FTSE Russell as part of the FTSE Italia Index Series, it comprises all the constituents of the FTSE MIB, the FTSE Italia Mid Cap and the FTSE Italia Small Cap.

== Methodology ==
Eligible shares must pass the free float and liquidity screens of the FTSE Italia Index Series: companies with a free float of 5% or less are excluded, as are shares that do not reach a minimum trading volume over the twelve months before a review. The index includes the constituents of its three component indices and therefore follows their reviews.

The index is reviewed quarterly, in March, June, September and December, using market data as at the close of business on the Monday four weeks before the effective date; changes take effect after the close of business on the third Friday of the review month. Constituents are weighted by free-float market capitalisation and, unlike the other indices of the series, their weights are not capped; FTSE Russell also calculates a capped version, the FTSE Italia All-Share Capped Index, designed to comply with the UCITS requirements.

== Constituents ==
The following 185 companies (40 from the FTSE MIB, 60 from the FTSE Italia Mid Cap and 85 from the FTSE Italia Small Cap) were constituents of the index as of 27 October 2026, according to the list published by Borsa Italiana; the ticker and ISIN link to each company's page on the Borsa Italiana website, which also gives the ICB supersector. The latest quarterly review took effect on 21 September 2026.

Company	Ticker	ISIN	ICB supersector	Component index
A2A	A2A	IT0001233417	Utilities	FTSE MIB
Abitare In	ABT	IT0005445280	Consumer Products and Services	Small Cap
Acea	ACE	IT0001207098	Utilities	Mid Cap
Aedes	AEDES	IT0005708174	Real Estate	Small Cap
Aeffe	AEF	IT0001384590	Consumer Products and Services	Small Cap
Aeroporto di Bologna	ADB	IT0001006128	Industrial Goods and Services	Small Cap
Alerion	ARN	IT0004720733	Utilities	Mid Cap
Altea Green Power	AGP	IT0005472730	Utilities	Small Cap
Amplifon	AMP	IT0004056880	Health Care	FTSE MIB
Anima Holding	ANIM	IT0004998065	Financial Services	Mid Cap
Aquafil	ECNL	IT0005241192	Basic Resources	Small Cap
Ariston Holding	ARIS	NL0015000N33	Construction and Materials	Small Cap
Ascopiave	ASC	IT0004093263	Utilities	Mid Cap
Avio	AVIO	IT0005119810	Industrial Goods and Services	FTSE MIB
Azimut	AZM	IT0003261697	Financial Services	FTSE MIB
B&C Speakers	BEC	IT0001268561	Consumer Products and Services	Small Cap
Banca Generali	BGN	IT0001031084	Banks	Mid Cap
Banca Ifis	IF	IT0003188064	Financial Services	Mid Cap
Banca Mediolanum	BMED	IT0004776628	Financial Services	FTSE MIB
Banca Monte dei Paschi di Siena	BMPS	IT0005508921	Banks	FTSE MIB
Banca Profilo	PRO	IT0005704439	Banks	Small Cap
Banca Sistema	BST	IT0003173629	Banks	Small Cap
Banco BPM	BAMI	IT0005218380	Banks	FTSE MIB
Banco Desio	BDB	IT0001041000	Banks	Mid Cap
BasicNet	BAN	IT0001033700	Retail	Small Cap
Bastogi	B	IT0004412497	Travel and Leisure	Small Cap
Beewize	BWZ	IT0001487047	Technology	Small Cap
B.F.	BFG	IT0005187460	Food, Beverage and Tobacco	Mid Cap
BFF Bank	BFF	IT0005244402	Financial Services	Mid Cap
Biesse	BSS	IT0003097257	Industrial Goods and Services	Small Cap
Borgosesia	BO	IT0003217335	Industrial Goods and Services	Small Cap
BPER Banca	BPE	IT0000066123	Banks	FTSE MIB
Brembo	BRE	NL0015001KT6	Automobiles and Parts	Mid Cap
Brioschi	BRI	IT0000066180	Real Estate	Small Cap
Brunello Cucinelli	BC	IT0004764699	Consumer Products and Services	FTSE MIB
Buzzi	BZU	IT0001347308	Construction and Materials	FTSE MIB
Cairo Communication	CAI	IT0004329733	Media	Small Cap
Caleffi	CLF	IT0003025019	Consumer Products and Services	Small Cap
Caltagirone	CALT	IT0003127930	Construction and Materials	Mid Cap
Caltagirone Editore	CED	IT0001472171	Media	Small Cap
Campari	CPR	NL0015435975	Food, Beverage and Tobacco	FTSE MIB
Carel Industries	CRL	IT0005331019	Construction and Materials	Mid Cap
Cellularline	CELL	IT0005244618	Retail	Small Cap
Cembre	CMB	IT0001128047	Industrial Goods and Services	Mid Cap
Cementir Holding	CEM	NL0013995087	Construction and Materials	Mid Cap
Centrale del Latte d'Italia	CLI	IT0003023980	Food, Beverage and Tobacco	Small Cap
CIR	CIR	IT0000070786	Automobiles and Parts	Mid Cap
Class Editori	CLE	IT0005117848	Media	Small Cap
Comer Industries	COM	IT0005246191	Industrial Goods and Services	Mid Cap
Credem	CE	IT0003121677	Banks	Mid Cap
CSP International	CSP	IT0001127874	Basic Resources	Small Cap
Cy4Gate	CY4	IT0005412504	Technology	Small Cap
D'Amico International Shipping	DIS	LU2592315662	Industrial Goods and Services	Mid Cap
Danieli & C.	DAN	IT0000076502	Industrial Goods and Services	Mid Cap
De'Longhi	DLG	IT0003115950	Consumer Products and Services	Mid Cap
Dexelance	DEX	IT0005543480	Consumer Products and Services	Small Cap
DiaSorin	DIA	IT0003492391	Health Care	Mid Cap
Digital Bros	DIB	IT0001469995	Consumer Products and Services	Small Cap
doValue	DOV	IT0005610958	Financial Services	Small Cap
El.En.	ELN	IT0005453250	Health Care	Mid Cap
Elica	ELC	IT0003404214	Consumer Products and Services	Small Cap
Emak	EM	IT0001237053	Consumer Products and Services	Small Cap
ENAV	ENAV	IT0005176406	Industrial Goods and Services	Mid Cap
Enel	ENEL	IT0003128367	Utilities	FTSE MIB
Enervit	ENV	IT0004356751	Food, Beverage and Tobacco	Small Cap
Eni	ENI	IT0003132476	Energy	FTSE MIB
EPH Invest	EPH	IT0005730095	Consumer Products and Services	Small Cap
Equita Group	EQUI	IT0005312027	Financial Services	Small Cap
ERG	ERG	IT0001157020	Utilities	Mid Cap
Esprinet	PRT	IT0003850929	Technology	Small Cap
Eurogroup Laminations	EGLA	IT0005527616	Industrial Goods and Services	Small Cap
Eurotech	ETH	IT0003895668	Technology	Small Cap
Ferrari	RACE	NL0011585146	Automobiles and Parts	FTSE MIB
Ferretti	YACHT	IT0005383291	Consumer Products and Services	Mid Cap
Fidia	FDA	IT0005654683	Industrial Goods and Services	Small Cap
Fiera Milano	FM	IT0003365613	Industrial Goods and Services	Mid Cap
FILA	FILA	IT0004967292	Personal Care, Drug and Grocery Stores	Small Cap
Fincantieri	FCT	IT0005599938	Industrial Goods and Services	FTSE MIB
Fine Foods & Pharmaceuticals N.T.M.	FF	IT0005215329	Health Care	Small Cap
FinecoBank	FBK	IT0000072170	Banks	FTSE MIB
FNM	FNM	IT0000060886	Industrial Goods and Services	Small Cap
Gabetti	GAB	IT0005023038	Real Estate	Small Cap
Garofalo Health Care	GHC	IT0005345233	Health Care	Mid Cap
Gas Plus	GSP	IT0004098510	Energy	Small Cap
Gefran	GE	IT0003203947	Industrial Goods and Services	Small Cap
Generalfinance	GF	IT0005144784	Financial Services	Small Cap
Generali	G	IT0000062072	Insurance	FTSE MIB
Gens Aurea	OROX	IT0005713232	Retail	Mid Cap
Geox	GEO	IT0003697080	Consumer Products and Services	Small Cap
GPI	GPI	IT0005221517	Health Care	Small Cap
GVS	GVS	IT0005411209	Health Care	Mid Cap
Hera	HER	IT0001250932	Utilities	FTSE MIB
I Grandi Viaggi	IGV	IT0005108219	Travel and Leisure	Small Cap
IGD	IGD	IT0005322612	Real Estate	Small Cap
IMMSI	IMS	IT0001413837	Consumer Products and Services	Small Cap
Indel B	INDB	IT0005245508	Construction and Materials	Small Cap
Industrie De Nora	DNR	IT0005186371	Industrial Goods and Services	Small Cap
Intercos	ICOS	IT0005455875	Consumer Products and Services	Mid Cap
Interpump Group	IP	IT0001078911	Industrial Goods and Services	Mid Cap
Intesa Sanpaolo	ISP	IT0000072618	Banks	FTSE MIB
Inwit	INW	IT0005090300	Telecommunications	FTSE MIB
IRCE	IRC	IT0001077780	Industrial Goods and Services	Small Cap
Iren	IRE	IT0003027817	Utilities	Mid Cap
Italgas	IG	IT0005211237	Utilities	FTSE MIB
Italian Exhibition Group	IEG	IT0003411417	Travel and Leisure	Small Cap
Italmobiliare	ITM	IT0005253205	Financial Services	Mid Cap
Itway	ITW	IT0003057624	Technology	Small Cap
Iveco Group	IVG	NL0015000LU4	Industrial Goods and Services	FTSE MIB
Juventus	JUVE	IT0005572778	Travel and Leisure	Mid Cap
Kruso Kapital	KK	IT0005707341	Financial Services	Small Cap
Landi Renzo	LNDR	IT0005619843	Automobiles and Parts	Small Cap
Leonardo	LDO	IT0003856405	Industrial Goods and Services	FTSE MIB
Lottomatica Group	LTMC	IT0005541336	Travel and Leisure	FTSE MIB
LU-VE	LUVE	IT0005107492	Construction and Materials	Mid Cap
Maire	MAIRE	IT0004931058	Construction and Materials	Mid Cap
MARR	MARR	IT0003428445	Personal Care, Drug and Grocery Stores	Small Cap
Mediobanca	MB	IT0000062957	Banks	FTSE MIB
Met.Extra Group	MET	IT0005481855	Financial Services	Small Cap
MFE (A shares)	MFEA	NL0015001OI1	Media	Mid Cap
MFE (B shares)	MFEB	NL0015001OJ9	Media	Mid Cap
Moltiply Group	MOL	IT0004195308	Financial Services	Mid Cap
Moncler	MONC	IT0004965148	Consumer Products and Services	FTSE MIB
Mondadori	MN	IT0001469383	Media	Mid Cap
Mondo TV	MTV	IT0001447785	Media	Small Cap
Neodecortech	NDT	IT0005275778	Basic Resources	Small Cap
NewPrinces	NWL	IT0005385213	Food, Beverage and Tobacco	Mid Cap
Nexi	NEXI	IT0005366767	Industrial Goods and Services	FTSE MIB
Olidata	OLI	IT0005634610	Technology	Small Cap
Orsero	ORS	IT0005138703	Food, Beverage and Tobacco	Small Cap
OVS	OVS	IT0005043507	Consumer Products and Services	Mid Cap
PharmaNutra	PHN	IT0005274094	Health Care	Mid Cap
Philogen	PHIL	IT0005373789	Health Care	Mid Cap
Piaggio	PIA	IT0003073266	Consumer Products and Services	Mid Cap
Pininfarina	PINF	IT0003056386	Automobiles and Parts	Small Cap
Piquadro	PQ	IT0004240443	Consumer Products and Services	Small Cap
Pirelli & C.	PIRC	IT0005278236	Automobiles and Parts	Mid Cap
PLC	PLC	IT0005339160	Construction and Materials	Small Cap
Poste Italiane	PST	IT0003796171	Financial Services	FTSE MIB
Prysmian	PRY	IT0004176001	Industrial Goods and Services	FTSE MIB
Rai Way	RWAY	IT0005054967	Telecommunications	Mid Cap
Ratti	RAT	IT0004724107	Basic Resources	Small Cap
RCS MediaGroup	RCS	IT0004931496	Media	Small Cap
Recordati	REC	IT0003828271	Health Care	FTSE MIB
Reply	REY	IT0005282865	Technology	Mid Cap
REVO Insurance	REVO	IT0005513202	Insurance	Mid Cap
Risanamento	RN	IT0001402269	Real Estate	Small Cap
Sabaf	SAB	IT0001042610	Technology	Small Cap
Safilo Group	SFL	IT0004604762	Consumer Products and Services	Mid Cap
Saipem	SPM	IT0005495657	Energy	FTSE MIB
Salvatore Ferragamo	SFER	IT0004712375	Consumer Products and Services	Mid Cap
Sanlorenzo	SL	IT0003549422	Consumer Products and Services	Mid Cap
Seco	IOT	IT0005438046	Technology	Small Cap
Seri Industrial	SERI	IT0005283640	Industrial Goods and Services	Small Cap
Sesa	SES	IT0004729759	Technology	Mid Cap
SIT	SIT	IT0005262149	Construction and Materials	Small Cap
Snam	SRG	IT0003153415	Energy	FTSE MIB
Softlab	SFT	IT0001469953	Telecommunications	Small Cap
SOGEFI	SGF	IT0000076536	Automobiles and Parts	Small Cap
SOL	SOL	IT0001206769	Chemicals	Mid Cap
Somec	SOM	IT0005329815	Construction and Materials	Small Cap
S.S. Lazio	SSL	IT0003621783	Travel and Leisure	Small Cap
Stellantis	STLAM	NL00150001Q9	Automobiles and Parts	FTSE MIB
STMicroelectronics	STMMI	NL0000226223	Technology	FTSE MIB
Sys-Dat	SYS	IT0005595423	Technology	Small Cap
Tamburi Investment Partners	TIP	IT0003153621	Financial Services	Mid Cap
Technogym	TGYM	IT0005162406	Consumer Products and Services	Mid Cap
Technoprobe	TPRO	IT0005482333	Technology	FTSE MIB
Telecom Italia	TIT	IT0005712671	Telecommunications	FTSE MIB
Tenaris	TEN	LU2598331598	Energy	FTSE MIB
Terna	TRN	IT0003242622	Utilities	FTSE MIB
Tesmec	TES	IT0004585243	Industrial Goods and Services	Small Cap
Tessellis	TSL	IT0005496473	Telecommunications	Small Cap
The Italian Sea Group	TISG	IT0005439085	Consumer Products and Services	Small Cap
Trevi	TFIN	IT0005709909	Construction and Materials	Small Cap
Triboo	TB	IT0005001554	Media	Small Cap
TXT e-solutions	TXT	IT0001454435	Technology	Mid Cap
UniCredit	UCG	IT0005239360	Banks	FTSE MIB
Unidata	UD	IT0005573065	Telecommunications	Small Cap
Unipol	UNI	IT0004810054	Insurance	FTSE MIB
Valsoia	VLS	IT0001018362	Food, Beverage and Tobacco	Small Cap
Webuild	WBD	IT0003865570	Construction and Materials	Mid Cap
WIIT	WIIT	IT0005440893	Technology	Mid Cap
Zest	ZEST	IT0005013013	Financial Services	Small Cap
Zignago Vetro	ZV	IT0004171440	Industrial Goods and Services	Mid Cap
Zucchi	ZUC	IT0005395071	Basic Resources	Small Cap

== See also ==
- FTSE MIB
- FTSE Italia Mid Cap
- FTSE Italia Small Cap
- FTSE Italia STAR
- FTSE Italia Growth
- FTSE Italia Brands
- List of stock market indices
