= FTSE Italia Small Cap =

Italian stock market index

The FTSE Italia Small Cap is a stock market index of Borsa Italiana, the main stock exchange of Italy. Calculated by FTSE Russell as part of the FTSE Italia Index Series, it comprises the smaller companies listed on the Euronext Milan and Euronext MIV Milan markets that pass the index series' free float and liquidity screens and are not constituents of the FTSE MIB or the FTSE Italia Mid Cap. Together with these two indices it forms the FTSE Italia All-Share index.

== Methodology ==
Eligible shares must pass the free float and liquidity screens of the FTSE Italia Index Series: companies with a free float of 5% or less are excluded, as are shares that do not reach a minimum trading volume over the twelve months before a review. All eligible shares that are not included in the FTSE MIB or the FTSE Italia Mid Cap are included in the index, so the number of constituents is not fixed; secondary lines are not eligible.

The index is reviewed quarterly, in March, June, September and December, using market data as at the close of business on the Monday four weeks before the effective date; changes take effect after the close of business on the third Friday of the review month. Movements between the Small Cap and Mid Cap indices are subject to the buffer that applies to the FTSE Italia Mid Cap: a company joins the Mid Cap if it ranks 55th or higher and leaves it if it falls to 66th or below. Constituents are weighted by free-float market capitalisation, and individual weights are capped at 10% at each quarterly review.

== Constituents ==
The following 85 companies were constituents of the index as of 27 October 2026, according to the list published by Borsa Italiana; the ticker and ISIN link to each company's page on the Borsa Italiana website, which also gives the ICB supersector. The latest quarterly review took effect on 21 September 2026.

Company	Ticker	ISIN	ICB supersector
Abitare In	ABT	IT0005445280	Consumer Products and Services
Aedes	AEDES	IT0005708174	Real Estate
Aeffe	AEF	IT0001384590	Consumer Products and Services
Aeroporto di Bologna	ADB	IT0001006128	Industrial Goods and Services
Altea Green Power	AGP	IT0005472730	Utilities
Aquafil	ECNL	IT0005241192	Basic Resources
Ariston Holding	ARIS	NL0015000N33	Construction and Materials
B&C Speakers	BEC	IT0001268561	Consumer Products and Services
Banca Profilo	PRO	IT0005704439	Banks
Banca Sistema	BST	IT0003173629	Banks
BasicNet	BAN	IT0001033700	Retail
Bastogi	B	IT0004412497	Travel and Leisure
Beewize	BWZ	IT0001487047	Technology
Biesse	BSS	IT0003097257	Industrial Goods and Services
Borgosesia	BO	IT0003217335	Industrial Goods and Services
Brioschi	BRI	IT0000066180	Real Estate
Cairo Communication	CAI	IT0004329733	Media
Caleffi	CLF	IT0003025019	Consumer Products and Services
Caltagirone Editore	CED	IT0001472171	Media
Cellularline	CELL	IT0005244618	Retail
Centrale del Latte d'Italia	CLI	IT0003023980	Food, Beverage and Tobacco
Class Editori	CLE	IT0005117848	Media
CSP International	CSP	IT0001127874	Basic Resources
Cy4Gate	CY4	IT0005412504	Technology
Dexelance	DEX	IT0005543480	Consumer Products and Services
Digital Bros	DIB	IT0001469995	Consumer Products and Services
doValue	DOV	IT0005610958	Financial Services
Elica	ELC	IT0003404214	Consumer Products and Services
Emak	EM	IT0001237053	Consumer Products and Services
Enervit	ENV	IT0004356751	Food, Beverage and Tobacco
EPH Invest	EPH	IT0005730095	Consumer Products and Services
Equita Group	EQUI	IT0005312027	Financial Services
Esprinet	PRT	IT0003850929	Technology
Eurogroup Laminations	EGLA	IT0005527616	Industrial Goods and Services
Eurotech	ETH	IT0003895668	Technology
Fidia	FDA	IT0005654683	Industrial Goods and Services
FILA	FILA	IT0004967292	Personal Care, Drug and Grocery Stores
Fine Foods & Pharmaceuticals N.T.M.	FF	IT0005215329	Health Care
FNM	FNM	IT0000060886	Industrial Goods and Services
Gabetti	GAB	IT0005023038	Real Estate
Gas Plus	GSP	IT0004098510	Energy
Gefran	GE	IT0003203947	Industrial Goods and Services
Generalfinance	GF	IT0005144784	Financial Services
Geox	GEO	IT0003697080	Consumer Products and Services
GPI	GPI	IT0005221517	Health Care
I Grandi Viaggi	IGV	IT0005108219	Travel and Leisure
IGD	IGD	IT0005322612	Real Estate
IMMSI	IMS	IT0001413837	Consumer Products and Services
Indel B	INDB	IT0005245508	Construction and Materials
Industrie De Nora	DNR	IT0005186371	Industrial Goods and Services
IRCE	IRC	IT0001077780	Industrial Goods and Services
Italian Exhibition Group	IEG	IT0003411417	Travel and Leisure
Itway	ITW	IT0003057624	Technology
Kruso Kapital	KK	IT0005707341	Financial Services
Landi Renzo	LNDR	IT0005619843	Automobiles and Parts
MARR	MARR	IT0003428445	Personal Care, Drug and Grocery Stores
Met.Extra Group	MET	IT0005481855	Financial Services
Mondo TV	MTV	IT0001447785	Media
Neodecortech	NDT	IT0005275778	Basic Resources
Olidata	OLI	IT0005634610	Technology
Orsero	ORS	IT0005138703	Food, Beverage and Tobacco
Pininfarina	PINF	IT0003056386	Automobiles and Parts
Piquadro	PQ	IT0004240443	Consumer Products and Services
PLC	PLC	IT0005339160	Construction and Materials
Ratti	RAT	IT0004724107	Basic Resources
RCS MediaGroup	RCS	IT0004931496	Media
Risanamento	RN	IT0001402269	Real Estate
Sabaf	SAB	IT0001042610	Technology
Seco	IOT	IT0005438046	Technology
Seri Industrial	SERI	IT0005283640	Industrial Goods and Services
SIT	SIT	IT0005262149	Construction and Materials
Softlab	SFT	IT0001469953	Telecommunications
SOGEFI	SGF	IT0000076536	Automobiles and Parts
Somec	SOM	IT0005329815	Construction and Materials
S.S. Lazio	SSL	IT0003621783	Travel and Leisure
Sys-Dat	SYS	IT0005595423	Technology
Tesmec	TES	IT0004585243	Industrial Goods and Services
Tessellis	TSL	IT0005496473	Telecommunications
The Italian Sea Group	TISG	IT0005439085	Consumer Products and Services
Trevi	TFIN	IT0005709909	Construction and Materials
Triboo	TB	IT0005001554	Media
Unidata	UD	IT0005573065	Telecommunications
Valsoia	VLS	IT0001018362	Food, Beverage and Tobacco
Zest	ZEST	IT0005013013	Financial Services
Zucchi	ZUC	IT0005395071	Basic Resources

== See also ==
- FTSE MIB
- FTSE Italia Mid Cap
- FTSE Italia All-Share
- FTSE Italia STAR
- FTSE Italia Growth
- FTSE Italia Brands
- List of stock market indices
