= FTSE Italia STAR =

Italian stock market index

The FTSE Italia STAR is a stock market index of Borsa Italiana, the main stock exchange of Italy. Calculated by FTSE Russell as part of the FTSE Italia Index Series, it comprises the companies listed on the Euronext STAR Milan segment of the Euronext Milan market that pass the index series' free float and liquidity screens.

== Methodology ==
All shares listed on the Euronext STAR Milan segment are eligible for inclusion if they pass the free float and liquidity screens of the FTSE Italia Index Series; unlike the other indices of the series, dual class shares are also eligible. The index is reviewed quarterly, in March, June, September and December, using market data as at the close of business on the Monday four weeks before the effective date; changes take effect after the close of business on the third Friday of the review month. Constituents are weighted by free-float market capitalisation, and individual weights are capped at 10% at each quarterly review.

== Constituents ==
The following 57 companies were constituents of the index as of 27 October 2026, according to the list published by Borsa Italiana; the ticker and ISIN link to each company's page on the Borsa Italiana website, which also gives the ICB supersector. The last column shows the FTSE Italia size index to which each company belongs.

| Company | Ticker | ISIN | ICB supersector | Size index |
|---|---|---|---|---|
| Aeroporto di Bologna | ADB | IT0001006128 | Industrial Goods and Services | Small Cap |
| Altea Green Power | AGP | IT0005472730 | Utilities | Small Cap |
| Amplifon | AMP | IT0004056880 | Health Care | FTSE MIB |
| Aquafil | ECNL | IT0005241192 | Basic Resources | Small Cap |
| Ascopiave | ASC | IT0004093263 | Utilities | Mid Cap |
| Avio | AVIO | IT0005119810 | Industrial Goods and Services | FTSE MIB |
| B&C Speakers | BEC | IT0001268561 | Consumer Products and Services | Small Cap |
| Banca Ifis | IF | IT0003188064 | Financial Services | Mid Cap |
| Banca Sistema | BST | IT0003173629 | Banks | Small Cap |
| Biesse | BSS | IT0003097257 | Industrial Goods and Services | Small Cap |
| Cairo Communication | CAI | IT0004329733 | Media | Small Cap |
| Carel Industries | CRL | IT0005331019 | Construction and Materials | Mid Cap |
| Cellularline | CELL | IT0005244618 | Retail | Small Cap |
| Cembre | CMB | IT0001128047 | Industrial Goods and Services | Mid Cap |
| Cementir Holding | CEM | NL0013995087 | Construction and Materials | Mid Cap |
| Cy4Gate | CY4 | IT0005412504 | Technology | Small Cap |
| D'Amico International Shipping | DIS | LU2592315662 | Industrial Goods and Services | Mid Cap |
| Digital Bros | DIB | IT0001469995 | Consumer Products and Services | Small Cap |
| doValue | DOV | IT0005610958 | Financial Services | Small Cap |
| El.En. | ELN | IT0005453250 | Health Care | Mid Cap |
| Elica | ELC | IT0003404214 | Consumer Products and Services | Small Cap |
| Emak | EM | IT0001237053 | Consumer Products and Services | Small Cap |
| Equita Group | EQUI | IT0005312027 | Financial Services | Small Cap |
| Esprinet | PRT | IT0003850929 | Technology | Small Cap |
| Eurotech | ETH | IT0003895668 | Technology | Small Cap |
| Fiera Milano | FM | IT0003365613 | Industrial Goods and Services | Mid Cap |
| FILA | FILA | IT0004967292 | Personal Care, Drug and Grocery Stores | Small Cap |
| Fine Foods & Pharmaceuticals N.T.M. | FF | IT0005215329 | Health Care | Small Cap |
| Garofalo Health Care | GHC | IT0005345233 | Health Care | Mid Cap |
| Gefran | GE | IT0003203947 | Industrial Goods and Services | Small Cap |
| Generalfinance | GF | IT0005144784 | Financial Services | Small Cap |
| IGD | IGD | IT0005322612 | Real Estate | Small Cap |
| Interpump Group | IP | IT0001078911 | Industrial Goods and Services | Mid Cap |
| IRCE | IRC | IT0001077780 | Industrial Goods and Services | Small Cap |
| Italmobiliare | ITM | IT0005253205 | Financial Services | Mid Cap |
| LU-VE | LUVE | IT0005107492 | Construction and Materials | Mid Cap |
| MARR | MARR | IT0003428445 | Personal Care, Drug and Grocery Stores | Small Cap |
| Moltiply Group | MOL | IT0004195308 | Financial Services | Mid Cap |
| Mondadori | MN | IT0001469383 | Media | Mid Cap |
| Neodecortech | NDT | IT0005275778 | Basic Resources | Small Cap |
| NewPrinces | NWL | IT0005385213 | Food, Beverage and Tobacco | Mid Cap |
| Orsero | ORS | IT0005138703 | Food, Beverage and Tobacco | Small Cap |
| PharmaNutra | PHN | IT0005274094 | Health Care | Mid Cap |
| Reply | REY | IT0005282865 | Technology | Mid Cap |
| REVO Insurance | REVO | IT0005513202 | Insurance | Mid Cap |
| Sabaf | SAB | IT0001042610 | Technology | Small Cap |
| Sanlorenzo | SL | IT0003549422 | Consumer Products and Services | Mid Cap |
| Seco | IOT | IT0005438046 | Technology | Small Cap |
| Sesa | SES | IT0004729759 | Technology | Mid Cap |
| SOGEFI | SGF | IT0000076536 | Automobiles and Parts | Small Cap |
| Sys-Dat | SYS | IT0005595423 | Technology | Small Cap |
| Tamburi Investment Partners | TIP | IT0003153621 | Financial Services | Mid Cap |
| Tesmec | TES | IT0004585243 | Industrial Goods and Services | Small Cap |
| TXT e-solutions | TXT | IT0001454435 | Technology | Mid Cap |
| Unidata | UD | IT0005573065 | Telecommunications | Small Cap |
| WIIT | WIIT | IT0005440893 | Technology | Mid Cap |
| Zignago Vetro | ZV | IT0004171440 | Industrial Goods and Services | Mid Cap |

== See also ==
- FTSE MIB
- FTSE Italia Mid Cap
- FTSE Italia Small Cap
- FTSE Italia All-Share
- FTSE Italia Growth
- FTSE Italia Brands
- List of stock market indices
