= FTSE Italia Brands =

Italian stock market index

The FTSE Italia Brands is a stock market index of Borsa Italiana, the main stock exchange of Italy. Calculated by FTSE Russell as part of the FTSE Italia Index Series, it comprises the constituents of the FTSE Italia All-Share that are included in the Italian Branded Stock List defined and published by Borsa Italiana.

== Methodology ==
The index is reviewed quarterly, in March, June, September and December, by identifying the FTSE Italia All-Share constituents included in Borsa Italiana's list; changes take effect after the close of business on the third Friday of the review month. Constituents are weighted by free-float market capitalisation and capped at each review according to UCITS requirements: no constituent may exceed 10%, and constituents with a weight above 5% may not exceed 40% in aggregate.

== Constituents ==
The following 21 companies were constituents of the index as of 27 October 2026, according to the list published by Borsa Italiana; the ticker and ISIN link to each company's page on the Borsa Italiana website, which also gives the ICB supersector.

Company	Ticker	ISIN	ICB supersector	Other FTSE Italia indices
Aeffe	AEF	IT0001384590	Consumer Products and Services	Small Cap
Brembo	BRE	NL0015001KT6	Automobiles and Parts	Mid Cap
Brunello Cucinelli	BC	IT0004764699	Consumer Products and Services	FTSE MIB
Campari	CPR	NL0015435975	Food, Beverage and Tobacco	FTSE MIB
De'Longhi	DLG	IT0003115950	Consumer Products and Services	Mid Cap
Elica	ELC	IT0003404214	Consumer Products and Services	Small Cap, FTSE Italia STAR
Ferrari	RACE	NL0011585146	Automobiles and Parts	FTSE MIB
FILA	FILA	IT0004967292	Personal Care, Drug and Grocery Stores	Small Cap, FTSE Italia STAR
Geox	GEO	IT0003697080	Consumer Products and Services	Small Cap
Juventus	JUVE	IT0005572778	Travel and Leisure	Mid Cap
Moncler	MONC	IT0004965148	Consumer Products and Services	FTSE MIB
OVS	OVS	IT0005043507	Consumer Products and Services	Mid Cap
Piaggio	PIA	IT0003073266	Consumer Products and Services	Mid Cap
Pininfarina	PINF	IT0003056386	Automobiles and Parts	Small Cap
Piquadro	PQ	IT0004240443	Consumer Products and Services	Small Cap
Pirelli & C.	PIRC	IT0005278236	Automobiles and Parts	Mid Cap
Safilo Group	SFL	IT0004604762	Consumer Products and Services	Mid Cap
Salvatore Ferragamo	SFER	IT0004712375	Consumer Products and Services	Mid Cap
Sanlorenzo	SL	IT0003549422	Consumer Products and Services	Mid Cap, FTSE Italia STAR
Stellantis	STLAM	NL00150001Q9	Automobiles and Parts	FTSE MIB
Technogym	TGYM	IT0005162406	Consumer Products and Services	Mid Cap

== See also ==
- FTSE MIB
- FTSE Italia Mid Cap
- FTSE Italia Small Cap
- FTSE Italia All-Share
- FTSE Italia STAR
- FTSE Italia Growth
- List of stock market indices
