= FTSE Italia Growth =

Italian stock market index

The FTSE Italia Growth is a stock market index of Borsa Italiana, the main stock exchange of Italy, that represents the companies traded on the Euronext Growth Milan market. It is calculated by FTSE Russell as part of the FTSE Italia Index Series.

== Methodology ==
All shares traded on Euronext Growth Milan are eligible for inclusion, except those traded on the market's professional segment. Unlike the other indices of the series, constituents are not screened for free float and liquidity, since the index is intended to mirror the market, and dual class shares are also eligible. Like the rest of the series, the index is reviewed quarterly, in March, June, September and December, with changes taking effect after the close of business on the third Friday of the review month.

== Constituents ==
The following 180 companies were constituents of the index as of 27 October 2026, according to the list published by Borsa Italiana; the ticker and ISIN link to each company's page on the Borsa Italiana website.

Company	Ticker	ISIN
4AIM SICAF	AIM	IT0005204729
4AIM SICAF Comparto 2 Crowdfunding	AIM2	IT0005440323
Aatech	AAT	IT0005548521
A.B.P. Nocivelli	ABP	IT0005439861
Adventure	ADV	IT0005735722
Alfio Bardolla	ABTG	IT0005244030
Alfonsino	ALFO	IT0005466039
Alia Mentis	ALMS	IT0005717241
Allcore	CORE	IT0005461303
Ambromobiliare	AMB	IT0004779515
Arterra Bioscience	ARBS	IT0005386369
Aton Green Storage	ATON	IT0005449464
Bellini Nautica	BELL	IT0005497042
Casta Diva Group	CDG	IT0005003782
Circle	CIRC	IT0005344996
Cleanbnb	CBB	IT0005377277
Cofle	CFL	IT0005465619
Com.Tel	CMTL	IT0005632945
Confinvest Oro	CFV	IT0005379604
Convergenze	CVG	IT0005426215
Copernico	COP	IT0005379406
Cyberoo	CYB	IT0005546103
Datrix	DATA	IT0005468357
DBA Group	DBA	IT0005285942
Dedem	DDM	IT0005659724
Deodato.Gallery	ART	IT0005528937
Destination Italia	DIT	IT0005454027
DHH	DHH	IT0005203622
Digitouch	DGT	IT0005089476
Dipietro Group	DPG	IT0005716813
Directa SIM	D	IT0001463063
Distribuzione Electrica Adriatica	DEA	IT0005600249
Doxee	DOX	IT0005394413
E-Globe	EGB	IT0005557514
Ecomembrane	ECMB	IT0005543332
Ecosuntek	ECK	IT0005654766
Edgelab	ELB	IT0005627762
Edil San Felice	ESF	IT0005561441
EHI	EHI	IT0005723405
Elsa Solutions	ELSA	IT0005561466
Emma Villas	EAV	IT0005562183
ENA	ENA	IT0005468290
Energy	ENY	IT0005500712
Energy Time	ET	IT0005660219
Entera	ENT	IT0005353575
Eprcomunicazione	EPRB	IT0005519837
Erredue	RDUE	IT0005521247
Esautomotion	ESAU	IT0005337107
ESI	ESIGM	IT0005421885
Espe	ESPE	IT0005573818
Estrima	ESTM	IT0005468191
ETI	ETI	IT0005720005
E.T.S. Engineering and Technical Services	ETS	IT0005669558
Eviso	EVISO	IT0005430936
Execus	EXEC	IT0005557530
Expert.ai	EXAI	IT0004496029
FAE Technology	FAE	IT0005500688
Farmacosmo	COSMO	IT0005487670
Finanza.Tech	FTC	IT0005475162
First Capital	FIC	IT0005252736
First Point	FPT	IT0005720500
Fope	FPE	IT0005203424
Franchetti	FCH	IT0005508574
Franchi Umberto Marmi	FUM	IT0005335754
Frendy Energy	FRE	IT0004819857
Friends	AMI	IT0005664641
Gambero Rosso	GAMB	IT0005122392
GEL	GEL	IT0005312365
Gentili Mosconi	GM	IT0005531261
Giglio.com	GCOM	IT0005453003
Giocamondo Study	GMS	IT0005652489
Gismondi 1754	GIS	IT0005391138
Giunti Psychometrics Holding	GPSY	IT0005722191
G.M. Leather	GML	IT0005498610
Green Oleo	GRN	IT0005549768
Grifal	GRAL	IT0005332595
Growens	GROW	IT0005040354
Guidotti Ships	GDT	IT0005723074
H-Farm	FARM	IT0004674666
Haiki+	HIK	IT0005628778
Helyx Industries	HLX	IT0005451213
High Quality Food	HQF	IT0005450694
IDNTT	IDNTT	CH1118852594
Ilpra	ILP	IT0005359101
I.M.D. International Medical Devices	IMD	IT0005549255
Impianti	MPT	IT0005518953
Industrie Chimiche Forestali	ICF	IT0005416281
Iniziative Bresciane	IB	IT0005037905
Innovatec	INC	IT0005412298
International Care Company	ICC	IT0005469371
Intred	ITD	IT0005337818
ISCC Fintech	ISC	IT0005474108
Italian Wine Brands	IWB	IT0005075764
Ivision Tech	IVN	IT0005554784
Kaleon	KLN	IT0005678104
Laboratorio Farmaceutico Erfo	ERFO	IT0005497885
Lemon Sistemi	LS	IT0005573438
Leone Film Group	LFG	IT0004973696
Lindbergh	LDB	IT0005469272
Litix	LTX	IT0005600801
Longino & Cardenal	LON	IT0005337073
Lucisano Media Group	LMG	IT0004522162
Magis	MGS	IT0005525347
Maps	MAPS	IT0005364333
Mare Engineering Group	MARE	IT0005588626
Markbass	MARK	IT0005670960
Marzocchi Pompe	MARP	IT0004376858
Masi Agricola	MASI	IT0004125677
Matica Fintec	MFT	IT0005388449
Metriks AI	MTK	IT0005651481
Mevim	MEV	IT0005586950
Misitano & Stracuzzi	MS	IT0005603078
MIT SIM	MTS	IT0005427510
Mondo TV France	MTVFR	FR001401B312
Nabla	NABLA	IT0005730384
Neurosoft	NRST	GRS802003004
Next Geosolutions Europe	NXT	IT0005594418
Notorious Pictures	NPI	IT0005025355
Novamarine	NOVA	IT0005605701
Nusco	NUS	IT0005453110
Officina Stellare	OS	IT0005374035
Omer	OMER	IT0005453748
OPT	OPTS	IT0005713646
Orange Media Group	OMG	IT0005733040
Otofarma	OTO	IT0005663361
Pasquarelli Auto	PSQ	IT0005546319
Pattern	PTR	IT0005378143
Più Medical	PMED	IT0005676140
Planetel	PLN	IT0005430951
Poligrafici Printing	POPR	IT0004587470
Porto Aviation Group	PAG	IT0005545238
Portobello	POR	IT0005337495
Powersoft	PWS	IT0005353815
Pozzi Milano	POZ	IT0005499949
Predict	PRE	IT0005611071
Promotica	PMT	IT0005425365
Racing Force	RFG	IT0005466963
Radici	RAD	IT0005379737
Redelfi	RDF	IT0005496101
Redfish Longterm Capital	RFLTC	IT0005549354
Renovalo	RNV	IT0005500571
RES	RES	IT0005543613
Reti	RETI	IT0005418204
Reway Group	RWY	IT0005528069
Rino Petino	RPTN	IT0005663429
Rocket Sharing Company	RKT	IT0005481830
RT&L	RTL	IT0005680373
Saccheria F.lli Franceschetti	SAC	IT0005521551
SBE-Varvit	VARV	IT0005568461
SG Company	SGC	IT0005337172
Siav	SIAV	IT0005504128
Sicily By Car	SBC	IT0005556581
Simone	SMN	IT0005573123
Società Editoriale Il Fatto	SEIF	IT0005353484
Soges Group	SOGES	IT0005597411
Solid World Group	S3D	IT0005497893
Sostravel.com	SOS	IT0005338675
Svas Biosana	SVS	IT0005469264
Tecma Solutions	TCM	IT0005425050
Tecno	TCG	IT0005658841
Telesia	TLS	IT0005240046
Telmes	TLM	IT0005683401
Tenax International	TNX	IT0005428898
TMP Group	TMP	IT0005531238
TPS	TPS	IT0005246142
Tradelab	TRAI	IT0005651507
Trawell Co	TWL	IT0005717571
Ubaldi Costruzioni	UBA	IT0005628158
UCapital24	U24	IT0005380461
Valica	VLC	IT0005562514
Valtecne	VLT	IT0005532525
Vantea Smart	VNT	IT0005433765
Vimi Fasteners	VIM	IT0004717200
Vinext	VNXT	IT0005652414
Vivenda Group	VVG	IT0005622581
VNE	VNE	IT0005556110
Websolute	WBS	IT0005384901
Xenia Hotellerie Solution	XHS	IT0005568487
Yakkyo	YKY	IT0005573966
Yolo Group	YOLO	IT0005495871

== See also ==
- FTSE MIB
- FTSE Italia Mid Cap
- FTSE Italia Small Cap
- FTSE Italia All-Share
- FTSE Italia STAR
- FTSE Italia Brands
- List of stock market indices
