= Nòverca =

Italian telecommunications company

Nòverca S.r.l.
- Formerly: e-Seed Telecommunications S.p.A. (2000–2006)
- Company type: Subsidiary
- Industry: Telecommunications
- Founded: 2000; 26 years ago
- Founder: Angel Ventures
- Headquarters: Rome, Italy
- Area served: Italy
- Products: Mobile telephony
- Brands: Kena Mobile
- Owner: TIM (100%)
- Parent: TIM
- Website: www.noverca.it

Nòverca S.r.l. (formerly e-Seed Telecommunications S.p.A.) is an Italian telecommunications company that operated in the mobile telephony sector as a Mobile Virtual Network Operator (MVNO) on the TIM network.

In 2015 Nòverca announced the transferred to TIM its consumer customers, following the decision to focus exclusively on Mobile Virtual Network Aggregator (MVNA) activities, integrating the already existing activity of Mobile Virtual Network Enabler (MVNE).

Previously part of the Acotel Group, in 2016 it was sold to TIM, which in 2017 entrusted it with control of Kena Mobile.

== History ==
The company was founded in 2000 under the name e-Seed by Gianfilippo Cuneo's Angel Ventures. It was a company operating in the interactive television sector.

In 2001 it was purchased, initially 50% and subsequently 100%, by the Acotel Group.

In 2006 it became Nòverca (a name that derives from the portmanteau of NOVità, 'news' and ricERCA, 'research', and whose logo is a stylization of the name with the "o" representing a little man making a phone call), launching instant messaging and VoIP software that exploited the SIP protocol.

In 2008, an industrial collaboration began between the Acotel Group and the Intesa Sanpaolo banking group, which involved the purchase by Intesa Sanpaolo of 4.75% of the share capital of the Acotel Group, the entry of Intesa Sanpaolo with 10% in the shareholding structure of Nòverca, and the establishment of a new company called Nòverca Italia in which Nòverca and Intesa Sanpaolo will participate respectively at 66% and 34% of the share capital. Nòverca Italia will operate on the Italian market as a Mobile Virtual Network Operator (MVNO).

The debut on the market took place on 30 March 2009. The offer, initially dedicated to consumer customers only, was extended to business customers in May 2011.

The Nòverca SIM prefixes, called Extended SIM, belonged to the fifth decade of 350 (i.e. 350–5). In the period prior to the conversion to Full MVNO, the prefixes issued belonged to the seventh decade of 370 (i.e. 370–7) as they derive from those of which TIM (support operator) is assigned for its ESP MVNOs.

The marketing of the Nòverca SIM was made available, as well as from the operator's Website, also from the Terrecablate Website and from the Rabona Mobile Website (the latter sold with ad hoc options), also through the Sisal and Lottomatica sales points through the purchase of a PIN code donated to your order on the site itself, in the absence of payment by credit card.

The available charging modes were:

- from a mobile phone, using the top-up code that can be purchased at Sisal and Lottomatica Servizi points;
- with mobile banking services;
- at the ATMs of the banks of the Intesa Sanpaolo group;
- from the site via credit card.

In May 2013 Intesa Sanpaolo left the company.

On January 9, 2015, TIM and Nòverca announced the transfer to TIM of approximately 170,000 active consumer customers of Nòverca following Nòverca's decision to focus exclusively on Mobile Virtual Network Aggregator (MVNA) activities, integrating the already existing activity of Mobile Virtual Network Enabler (MVNE).

From 1 February 2015, by virtue of this agreement, all Nòverca customers automatically became TIM customers, but were able to continue to use Nòverca services without any modification until 7 May 2015. All customers were given the opportunity to go at TIM sales points between 4 February 2015 and 2 May 2015, to port the number at favorable conditions to a new TIM SIM and continue to use mobile radio services at virtually unchanged economic conditions even after the definitive cessation of services on the SIM Nòverca, without prejudice to the customer's right to carry out portability to any other operator under current conditions, or to withdraw completely and without charge from the contract for the supply of mobile radio services.

Since May 7, 2015, Nòverca has stopped providing its mobile and personal communications services to consumer and business users, but has continued to provide mobile communications services for all existing and future contracts with the world of MVNOs as an MVNA provider and MVNE.

On 1 November 2016 Nòverca was sold to TIM and Nòverca Italia was put into liquidation.

In addition to continuing the activities of MVNE/MVNA, on 29 March 2017 Nòverca launched the Kena Mobile brand.

== Kena Mobile ==
Kena Mobile

Kena Mobile is an Italian Mobile Virtual Network Operator (MVNO) provided by Nòverca and belonging to TIM.

The service was launched for private customers only on March 29, 2017. The name "Kena" comes from the Polynesian mythological warrior of the same name.

At launch, Kena Mobile offered connectivity on the TIM network exclusively in 2G and 3G, with a maximum speed of 43 Mbit/s in download and 5.76 Mbit/s in upload, while from October 2018 4G has also been available, with maximum speeds of 30 Mbit/s in download and 5.76 Mbit/s in upload.

On July 14, 2018, Kena Mobile decided to create an offer for the home by announcing the "Kena Casa" service. At the moment the service is only available in some regions of Italy and offers the possibility of connecting via Wi-Fi and surfing without limits and without a fixed-line, using LTE. Speeds are 30 Mbit/s download and 3 Mbit/s upload.

The service takes care of providing FWA Internet access through the use of specific frequencies for WiMAX included in the spectrum between 3.4 and 3.6 GHz, but given the lack of these frequencies by Nòverca, the company had to turn to a third party for its network service, whose choice fell on Linkem.

== See also ==
- Acotel Group
- Intesa Sanpaolo
- TIM Group
