= Brioschi =

Brioschi is the surname of the following people:

- Antonio Brioschi (fl. c.1725–1750), Italian composer, pioneer in symphonic music of the early Classical period
- Francesco Brioschi (1824–1897), Italian mathematician
- Renato Brioschi (born 1948), Italian singer and composer

Brioschi may also refer to:

- Brioschi, Italian medical company
- Brioschi formula, a formula introduced by Francesco Brioschi for Gaussian curvature
