= Azimut Holding =

Italian asset management company

Azimut Holding S.p.A.
- Type: Public (Società per Azioni)
- Traded as: BIT: AZM; FTSE MIB component
- Industry: Financial
- Founded: 1990; 36 years ago
- Headquarters: Milan, Italy
- Key people: Pietro Giuliani (Chairman); Gabriele Blei (CEO); Massimo Guiati (CEO); Paolo Martini (CEO); Giorgio Medda (CEO); Alessandro Zambotti (CEO and CFO)
- Products: asset management; wealth management; investment banking; fintech
- Net income: ▲€454 million (2023)
- AUM: €111 billion (May 2025)
- Number of employees: 1,441 (2022)
- Website: www.azimut-group.com

Azimut Holding is an independent, global group in the asset management, wealth management, investment banking and fintech space, serving private and corporate clients.

Azimut Holding S.p.a.is listed on the Milan Stock Exchange (AZM.IM) since July 7, 2004, and is a member of the FTSE MIB index.

The Group has various companies active in the sale, management and distribution of financial and insurance products, with registered offices mainly in Italy, Australia, Brazil, Chile, China (Hong Kong and Shanghai), Egypt, Ireland, Luxembourg, Mexico, Monaco, Portugal, Singapore, Switzerland, Taiwan, Turkey, UAE and USA.

At the end of July 2024, total assets amounted to 103.4 billion euros.

== History ==
At the end of the 1980s, the first management company was founded under the name Azimut as part of Akros Finanziaria.

In 1990, a few months after the arrival of Pietro Giuliani, the Group's current chairman, the project from which the current Group was born came to life.

In 1998, Bipop-Carire acquires Azimut.

At the end of the 1990s, the Luxembourg management of AzFund (now Azimut Investments) starts.

In 2001, as a result of the restructuring of Bipop Carire, Azimut buys the company supported by Apax Partners. About 700 people invest in the MBO completed in June 2002.

In 2001 the regional distribution companies merge into Azimut Consulenza SIM (now Azimut Capital Management SGR).

In 2004 the holding company, Azimut Holding SpA, is listed on the Milan stock exchange.

AzLife (now Azimut Life) insurance company is established in Ireland and hedge management in Italy begins.

In 2010, Azimut Holding's stock entered the FTSE Mib index, and in the same year the Group began international expansion.

Between late 2010 and 2011, Azimut launches offices in Shanghai, Hong Kong, and Turkey and strengthens its position in Europe with a presence in Munich and Switzerland.

In 2013 it expands to Taiwan, Brazil, and Singapore.

In 2014 it signs its first acquisition in Mexico and enters the Australian market. It also launches a project in the area of alternative investments in private markets, later establishing a dedicated company, Azimut Libera Impresa SGR.

In 2015 it enters Chile and in 2016 the United States, in Miami. Two years later it starts a presence in the United Arab Emirates.

In 2019 it enters Egypt and starts Azimut Alternative Capital Partners in the United States with the aim of creating partnerships with management companies specializing in alternative investments.

In 2022 it opens an office in Portugal.

== Sustainability ==
In the field of sustainability, the Azimut Group launched the first fund with an SRI approach in 1993, the first ESG-compliant UCITS fund investing in hybrid bonds in 2015, and signed the UN PRI in 2020. It also carries out its commitment by supporting various sustainable development initiatives and activities, including the Carbon Disclosure Project and the Forum for Sustainable Finance, of which it is a member.

As of June 2024, assets in products that promote ESG characteristics amounted to EUR 19.2 billion.

== Economics data ==
The Group recorded total net inflows of €8.5 billion in 2022, of which about half (€4.3 billion) was directed into asset management products.

At the end of July 2024, total assets amounted to 103.4 billion euros.

== Shareholding structure ==
As of December 2025, Azimut Holding's main shareholders were

Shareholder	Stake (% of ordinary shares)
Timone Fiduciaria	21.2%
Helikon Investments	5.8%
Treasury shares (own shares)	0.8%
Other shareholders	72.3%
