= Banca Ifis =

Italian finance company

Banca Ifis S.p.A.
- Type: Public (Società per azioni)
- Traded as: BIT: IF; FTSE Italia Mid Cap
- Industry: Financial services
- Founded: 1983
- Headquarters: Venice, Italy
- Key people: Raffaele Zingone (CEO); Ernesto Fürstenberg Fassio (Chairman); Sebastien Egon Fürstenberg (Honorary Chairman)
- Products: Retail, Factoring, Specialty finance (commercial credit, acquisition/management and disposal of portfolios of non-performing loans and tax receivables, leasing and rental)
- Total assets: €21.6 billion (FY 2025)
- Number of employees: 2,695 (2025)
- Website: www.bancaifis.it/en/

The Banca Ifis S.p.A. Group (Istituto di Finanziamento e Sconto) is an Italian finance company that specialises in lending services to undertakings, and acquiring/servicing non-performing loan portfolios.

Founded in 1983 by Sebastien Egon Fürstenberg, son of Clara Agnelli, Banca Ifis has been listed on the Milan Stock Exchange (FTSE Italia STAR segment) since 2003.

== History ==
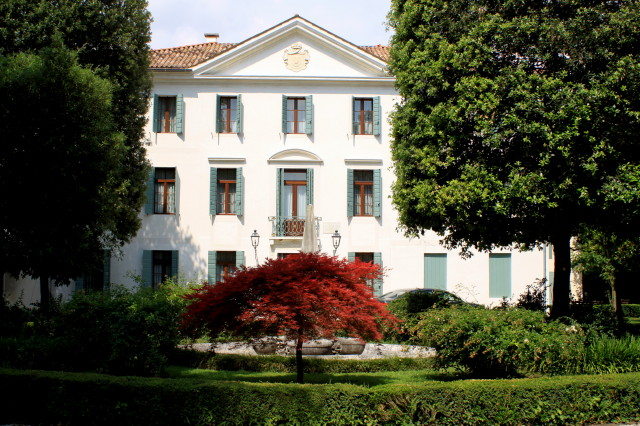
Bank Headquarters at Fürstenberg Villa

=== The origins ===
Instituto di Finanziamento e Sconto, I.Fi.S., was founded in 1983 in Genoa, where Sebastien Egon Fürstenberg, founder of the company and the current President, resided at the time.

I.Fi.S. was founded in Genoa as a specialized financial intermediary focusing on two core services: the acquisition of trade receivables and factoring-based financing. Operating as the captive finance company for the Americanino group, I.Fi.S. plays a crucial role in the denim company's supply chain by providing financing to suppliers and managing customer receivables.

=== 2002-2004: listing on the Stock Exchange ===
In 2002 Banca Ifis was authorised to carry out banking activities, and it changed its name from Ifis to Banca Ifis SpA. The same year, it became a Bank and joined Factor Chain International to operate on a global level, after opening branches in Romania and Poland. In 2003 Banca Ifis was admitted to the MTA (Mercato Telematico Azionario, the Online Stock Market), and in 2004 it entered the STAR segment.

=== 2008-2013: growth and diversification ===
The Bank's strategy is based on increasing its market share through the development of its historic core business: financial and management support for Small and Medium Enterprises (SMEs) in Italy and abroad. In 2008 Banca Ifis entered the world of retail with the launch of Rendimax, a high-yield online savings account. In 2013, it expanded its offer with the Contomax, an online checking account.

In 2011, Banca Ifis branched out into what would become its second core business: the purchase and management of non-performing loans by acquiring Toscana Finanza.

=== 2016-2020: acquisitions season ===
In 2016 Banca Ifis acquired Ge Capital Interbanca for 119 million Euro (with one billion of assets), entering the fields of leasing, medium-term lending and structured finance. Banca d'Italia acknowledged the operation on 29 November of the same year.

In 2018, development continued in the area of Non Performing Loans (NPL): Ifis Npl S.p.A., a joint-stock company established following the spin-off of the Npl Area of Banca Ifis, became fully operational, 100% controlled by the parent company. In 2018 the Bank entered the pharmacy lending sector, acquiring 70% of Credifarma S.p.A., a company jointly held by Italian Federfarma. The same year, it acquired Cap.Ital.Fin. S.p.A., a financial intermediary specialised in personal salary-backed loans.

In January 2019 Banca Ifis purchased FBS S.p.A., a company that operates in the NPL sector as a specialist in servicing activities, for €58.5 million, which today is included in Ifis Npl.

The Central Business Department was set up in 2019, bringing together all the business areas aimed at supporting enterprises. In October 2019 Banca Ifis completed the purchase of 10% of the remaining share capital of the subsidiary FBS S.p.A. and became its sole shareholder, consolidating its position as a major player in the market of non-performing loans in Italy.

In April 2020 the Banca Ifis Group formed a new vision of NPLs: the names of FBS S.p.A. and FBS Real Estate S.p.A.were changed to Ifis Npl Servicing S.p.A. and Ifis Real Estate S.p.A. The companies of the new Banca Ifis NPL Division were created with the aim of making the organisation more efficient and allowing it to effectively seize the best opportunities on the market.

Banca Ifis announced that it had successfully completed the competitive process for the purchase of 70.77% of the share capital of Farbanca S.p.A.

=== 2021: Npl area reorganization ===
On 1 January 2021 corporate reorganisation was completed in the Npl area, creating a vertical chain to guarantee the separation and independence between credit purchase and collection activities.

Since April 2021 Frederik Geertman becomes the new chief executive officer of the Group.

=== 2022: creation of Banca Credifarma ===
In April 2022, the merger by incorporation of Credifarma into Farbanca, which was approved in February, ends with the creation of Banca Credifarma, the first specialised pole in financial services to pharmacies.

=== 2023: acquisition of Revalea ===
In May 2023, Banca Ifis acquired the company Revalea Spa from the Mediobanca Group, born the previous year from the demerger of MBCredit Solutions Spa and active in the recovery of impaired loans.

In September, to mark the 40th anniversary of the Bank's foundation, the Bank inaugurated the "Parco Internazionale di Scultura", a permanent exhibition of monumental sculptures created at the behest of Ernesto Fürstenberg Fassio in the gardens of the 16th-century Villa Fürstenberg, the Group's historical headquarters in Mestre.

=== 2024: opening of the Parco Internazionale di Scultura ===
In April, the "Parco Internazionale di Scultura" was officially opened to the public. The exhibition hosts plastic works of contemporary sculpture by Italian and international artists, including Fernando Botero, Igor Mitoraj, Manolo Valdés, Pietro Consagra and Roberto Barni.

=== 2025: acquisition of illimity Bank ===
In January 2025, Banca Ifis launched a takeover bid for illimity Bank for €298 million. The acquisition was finalised in August 2025.

== Financial data ==
	NBI - Net Banking Income	Net profit	CET1	
2010	94.430 mln	18.6 mln	11.5%	Core Tier 1
2011	121.453 mln	26.5 mln	11.2%	Core Tier 1
2012	244.917 mln	78.1 mln	12.9%	Core Tier 1
2013	264.196 mln	84.8 mln	13.7%	Core Tier 1
2014	280.930 mln	95.8 mln	13.89%	
2015	407.958 mln	161.9 mln	14.7%	
2016	331.962 mln	89.7 mln	14.7%	
2017	553.108 mln	180.7mln	11.66%	
2018	576.503 mln	146.7 mln	10.3%	
2019	558.333 mln	123.1 mln	14.58%	
2020	467.800 mln	68.8 mln	11.29%	
2021	602.500 mln	100.6 mln	15.44%	
2022	680.547 mln	141.1 mln	15.01%	
2023	704.616 mln	160.1 mln	14.87%	
2024	699.2 mln	161.6 mln	16.10%	
2025	789.5 mln	328.9 mln	13%	

== Market share ==
- Banca Ifis is among the leading national operators in factoring in terms of turnover, with a market share of 4,2%, after Gruppo Intesa Sanpaolo (27%), Unicredit (19%), Ifitalia (11%) and Factorit (6%).
- Banca Ifis holds a 4,1% market share in leasing, positioning itself after Unicredit Leasing (14%), Intesa Sanpaolo Group (13%), BNP Paribas Leasing Solution (8%), Alba Leasing (7%), Iccrea BancaImpresa Group (6%), UBI Leasing (6%), Société Generale Equipment Finance Leasing (6%), MPS Leasing & Factoring (5%), Sardaleasing (4%), Credemleasing (4%), Crédit Agricole Leasing Italia (3%) and SelmaBipiemme Leasing (2%). Furthermore, Banca Ifis is a leader in electric car leasing.
- In the NPL segment, Banca Ifis is the sixth largest national operator in terms of assets under management with €24.4 billion worth of these preceded by doValue (68 billion Euro), Cerved Credit Management (46), Intrum Italia (41), Prelios Credit Servicing (40) and AMCO (35).

=== Shareholders ===
The shareholding structure communicated to Consob is as follows. The shareholding percentages are notified by the shareholders, in accordance with the provisions of article 120 of the Consolidated text of the provisions on financial intermediation (TUF). Minor parts of the shareholder structure can be indicated directly by the company through other sources. The share capital of Banca Ifis is equal to 53,811,095 Euro, divided into 53,811,095 ordinary shares with a par value of 1 euro. The following table shows Banca Ifis's shareholders that, either directly or indirectly, own equity instruments with voting rights (data updated on 14 April 2026):

Shareholder	Share
La Scogliera	45,05%
Preve Riccardo	4,67%
Market	49,08%
Treasury shares	1,2%
