= FTSE Russell =

British provider of stock market indices

- Type: Subsidiary
- Industry: Finance
- Founded: 1995; 31 years ago
- Headquarters: 10 Upper Bank Street; London, England, UK
- Key people: Fiona Bassett (CEO)
- Products: Financial indices
- Parent: London Stock Exchange Group
- Website: ftserussell.com

FTSE Russell is a subsidiary of London Stock Exchange Group (LSEG) that produces, maintains, licenses, and markets stock market indices. The division is notable for the FTSE 100 Index in the UK and the Russell 2000 Index in the US, among others.

The brand and division FTSE Russell was introduced in 2015, while integrating the indexing services of FTSE index series and Russell index series. In the same year, LSEG sold Frank Russell Company's asset management division Russell Investments. Also in 2015, FTSE Russell acquired the corporate data company Mergent.

In December 2020, FTSE Russell announced that it would strip its indexes of eight Chinese companies in response to U.S. Executive Order 13959.

On 2 March 2022, in response to the Russian invasion of Ukraine and resultant sanctions, FTSE Russell removed all Russian securities from all FTSE Russell indexes.

== Indexes ==
=== FTSE UK Index Series ===
- FTSE 100 Index
- FTSE 250 Index
- FTSE 350 Index
- FTSE SmallCap Index
- FTSE All-Share Index
- FTSE AIM UK 50 Index
- FTSE AIM 100 Index
- FTSE AIM All-Share Index

=== FTSE Italia Index Series ===
- FTSE MIB
- FTSE Italia Mid Cap
- FTSE Italia Small Cap
- FTSE Italia All-Share
- FTSE Italia Brands
- FTSE Italia STAR
- FTSE Italia Growth

=== Other FTSE indices ===
- FTSE Global Equity Index Series
- FTSE/Athex Large Cap
- FTSE China A50 Index
- FTSE Bursa Malaysia Index
- FTSE4Good Index

=== Russell Indexes ===
- Russell Top 50 Mega Cap Index
- Russell Top 200 Index (mega cap)
- Russell Midcap Index
- Russell 1000 Index (large cap)
- Russell 2000 Index (small cap)
- Russell 3000 Index (broad market)
- Russell Microcap Index
- Russell 2500 Index (small + mid cap)
- Russell Small Cap Completeness Index
