= Olidata =

Italian information technology company

Olidata S.p.A.
- Type: S.p.A.
- Traded as: BIT: OLI
- Industry: Information technology
- Founded: 1982
- Founder: Carlo Rossi; Adolfo Savini
- Headquarters: Rome, Italy
- Key people: Cristiano Rufini (chairman)
- Website: olidata.com

Olidata S.p.A. is an Italian information technology company based in Rome. Founded in Cesena in 1982, it was a computer manufacturer before being restructured and refocused on IT services.

== History ==
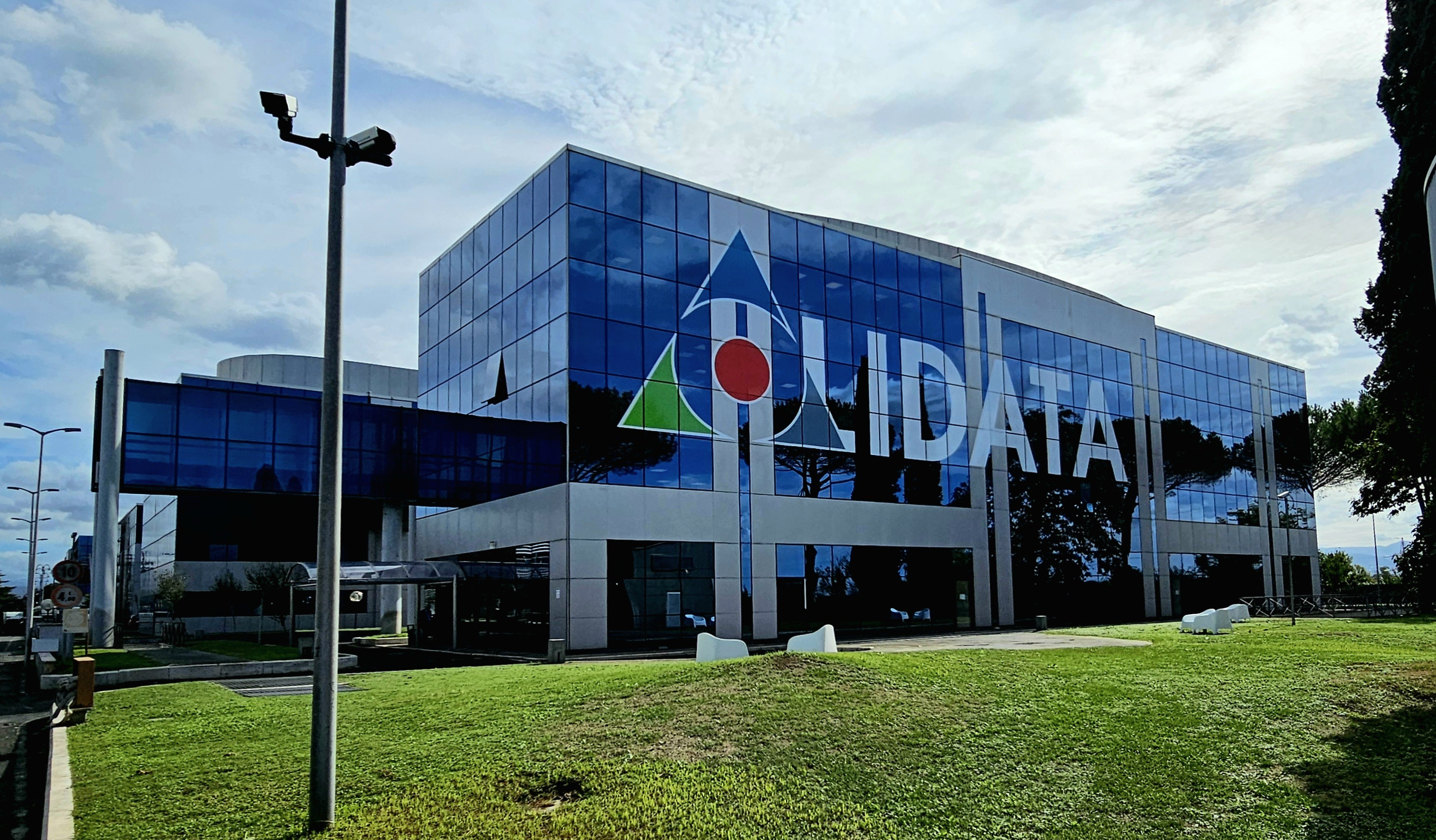
The company headquarters in Rome

Olidata was founded in Cesena in 1982 by Carlo Rossi and Adolfo Savini. It began as a software house specialising in accounting software and later moved into computer manufacturing. It was listed on the Borsa Italiana in 1999. In April 2008 it announced the JumPc, a version of Intel's Classmate PC. In 2009 Acer agreed to buy 29.9% of Olidata from shareholder Poseidone S.r.l.

In March 2016 the board placed the company in liquidation, and its shares were suspended from trading. The liquidation was revoked in April 2018 and the company signed a partnership with Medion. In July 2022 the Court of Forlì approved a composition with creditors (concordato preventivo) plan. Cristiano Rufini, head of Sferanet, became the controlling shareholder and chairman in November 2022, and the shares resumed trading on Euronext Milan on 3 April 2023.
