= TXT e-solutions =

Software company

- Type: Public (Borsa Italiana): MI)
- Traded as: FTSE Italia Mid Cap
- Industry: Software & Programming
- Founded: Milan, Italy (1989)
- Headquarters: Milan, Italy
- Number of locations: Italy, France, UK, Germany, Switzerland, United States
- Key people: Enrico Magni, President; Daniele Misani, CEO
- Revenue: €68.753 million Euro (2020)
- Number of employees: 996 (As of 2020)

TXT e-solutions is an international software development and consulting company. It was founded in 1989, and has been listed on the Borsa Italiana–London Stock Exchange (TXT.MI) STAR segment since July 2000.

== Overview ==
TXT operates within several industries including aerospace, aviation, defense, industrial, government, and fintech. The company's headquarters are in Milan, but it has subsidiaries in Italy, Germany, the United Kingdom, France, Switzerland and the United States. The holding company TXT e-solutions S.p.A, has been listed on the Italian Stock Exchange, STAR segment (TXT.MI), since July 2000.

The company also has research & development functionalities and its research team has been involved in Italian and international research programs.

== History ==
TXT e-solution was founded in 1989. In the 1990s, its software products consisted of production planning and scheduling, and its first software suite was intended for supply chain management (SCM). In 2000, it created subsidiaries in France, Spain, United Kingdom and Germany. In 2002, the company released its first solutions for supply chain management, demand management and sales and operations planning. The year after, it released additional software products for product data management (PDM).

In 2004, additional software products for demand & supply chain management and sales & operation planning were released, as well as a new polymedia mobile platform. In 2006, the company teamed up with Microsoft on the Industry Builder Initiative to cover supply chain planning needs of consumer-driven industries. The following year, the company was restructured into three divisions: TXT PERFORM, TXT POLYMEDIA, and TXT NEXT.

In 2008, the company released TXTPERFORM2008, a supply chain planning suite with business intelligence functionalities, and then Media in a Box, a multimedia content management platform.

Subsequently, two subsidiaries of the company introduced new offerings: software designed for managing the entire lifecycle of products, and a dedicated service line for digital manufacturing specifically tailored for the aerospace industry.

In 2011, TXT e-solutions focused its development strategy on the TXT PERFORM and TXT NEXT divisions. That year, TXT Polymedia business was sold to Kit Digital Inc..

On 2 October 2017, TXT group finalized the sale of the TXT Retail (TXT PERFORM) division to Aptos, Inc. (formerly a division of Epicor).

== See also ==
- Product lifecycle management
- Supply chain management
