= Reply (company) =

Italian IT consulting and digital services company

Reply S.p.A.
- Type: Public company
- Traded as: BIT: REY
- Industry: Information technology consulting
- Founded: 1996; 30 years ago
- Founder: Mario Rizzante
- Headquarters: Turin, Italy
- Key people: Mario Rizzante (chairman); Tatiana Rizzante (CEO)
- Services: Business consulting; System integration; Digital services
- Revenue: €2.48 billion (2025)
- Net income: €250.9 million (2025)
- Number of employees: 17,200+
- Subsidiaries: Reply Deutschland SE, Reply Inc.
- Website: www.reply.com

Reply S.p.A. is an Italian information technology consulting, system integration and digital services company headquartered in Turin. It describes itself as a network of highly specialised companies that support large industrial groups in developing business models based on technologies such as artificial intelligence, big data, cloud computing and the Internet of things.

== History ==
Reply was founded in Turin in 1996. The company uses a network model made up of dozens of companies, controlled by a parent company and each focused on a specific business, operating in areas such as big data, cloud computing, digital media and the Internet of things.

Tatiana Rizzante, one of the company's founding members, became chief executive officer in 2006 and became responsible for the group's services and for building its presence in Europe, the United States, Brazil and China. Filippo Rizzante is the group's chief technology officer.

Reply was listed on the STAR segment of Borsa Italiana in 2000, when its revenue was €33.3 million. In 2025 consolidated revenue reached €2,483.6 million, up 8.0% on 2024, with EBITDA of €467.6 million and a group net profit of €250.9 million. The group says it has more than 17,200 employees in 16 countries.

In July 2026 Reply opened Reply House, its new headquarters in Turin, in the former De Sonnaz Barracks. The restored building covers about 20,500 square metres and houses offices and laboratories for applied artificial intelligence.

== Corporate structure ==
Alika S.r.l., a holding company based in Turin, holds 13,872,740 ordinary shares of Reply, equal to 37.082% of its share capital. In September 2025 Mario Rizzante, Maria Graziella Paglia, Tatiana Rizzante, Filippo Rizzante and Wonderland S.r.l. signed a shareholders' agreement governing their stakes in the holding that controls Alika. No party controls it alone, but the agreement allows them to appoint its management and control bodies in accordance with Mario Rizzante's instructions.
