= Carel Industries =

Italian HVAC manufacturer (founded 1973)

- Type: Società per azioni
- Traded as: BIT: CRL; FTSE Italia Mid Cap
- Industry: Electronics
- Founded: 1973; 53 years ago in Brugine, Italy
- Founders: Luigi Rossi Luciani, Luigi Nalini, Rocco Cilenti, Giancarlo Galvani
- Headquarters: Brugine, Padua, Italy
- Key people: Luigi Rossi Luciani (Chairman); Francesco Nalini (CEO)
- Products: Programmable controllers; Parametric controllers; Humidifiers; Remote management and monitoring systems
- Revenue: €629 million (2025)
- Website: https://www.carel.com/

Carel Industries is an Italian multinational company that designs, manufactures, and markets hardware and software for managing air conditioning, refrigeration, humidification, and evaporative cooling systems. Founded in 1973 in Brugine, Padua, Italy, as of 2025 it operates 12 production sites and employs over 2,700 people. In 2018, it was listed on the Milan Stock Exchange in the FTSE Italia STAR and FTSE Italia Small Cap indices.

== History ==
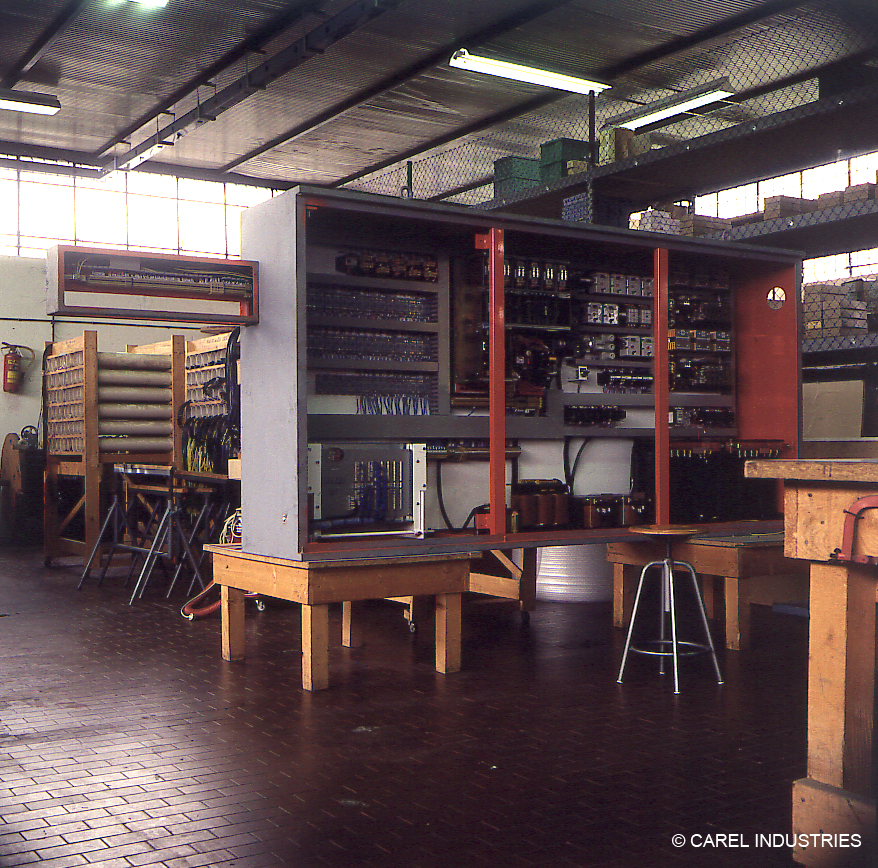
CAREL's first plant

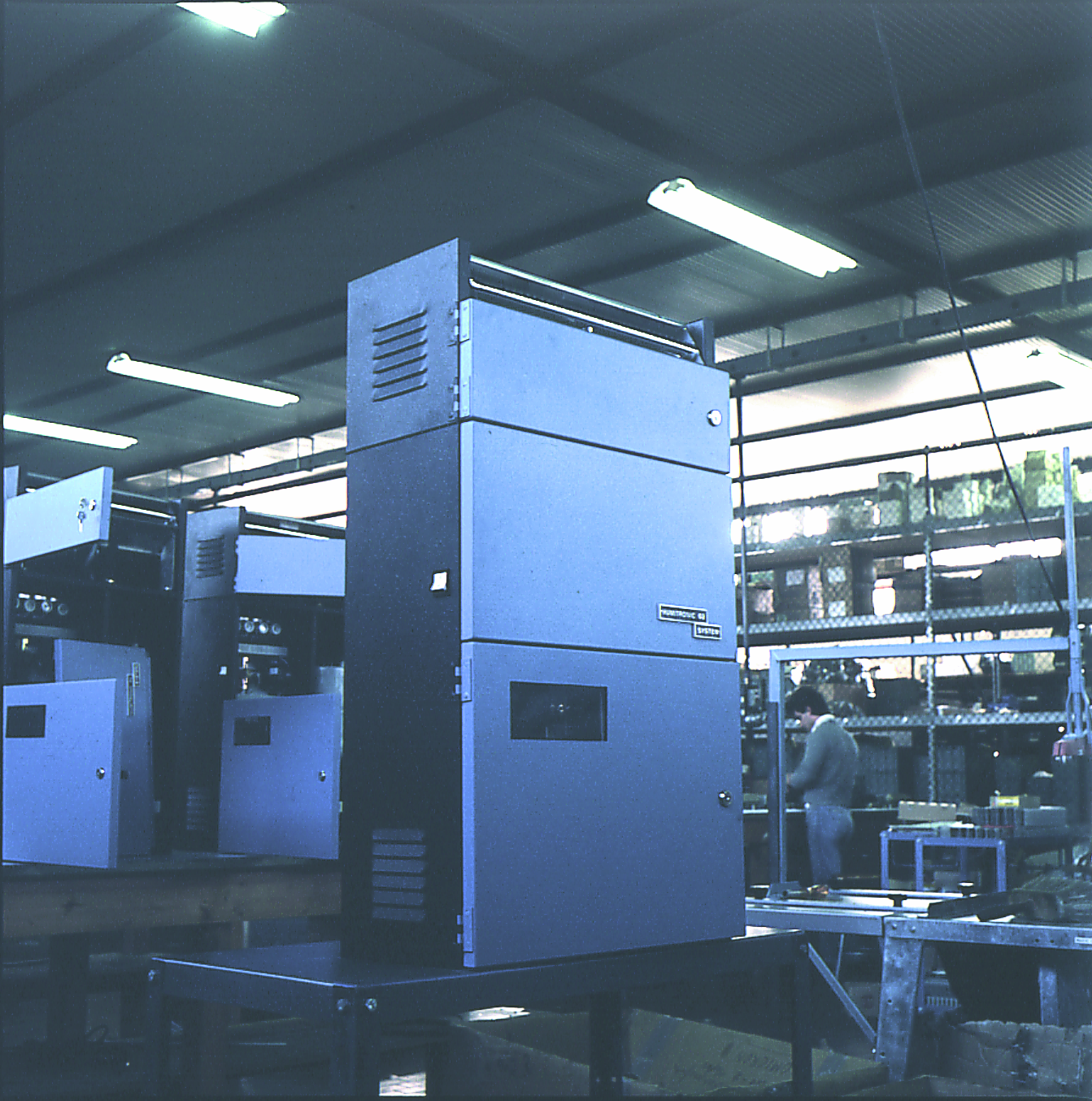
CAREL miprosent

The firm was founded in 1973 in the province of Padua as a business-to-business company, as C.AR.EL., Costruzioni ARmadi ELettrici. Carel began operating as a supplier for a manufacturer of air conditioning units for computing centres (Hiross), producing its electrotechnical component.

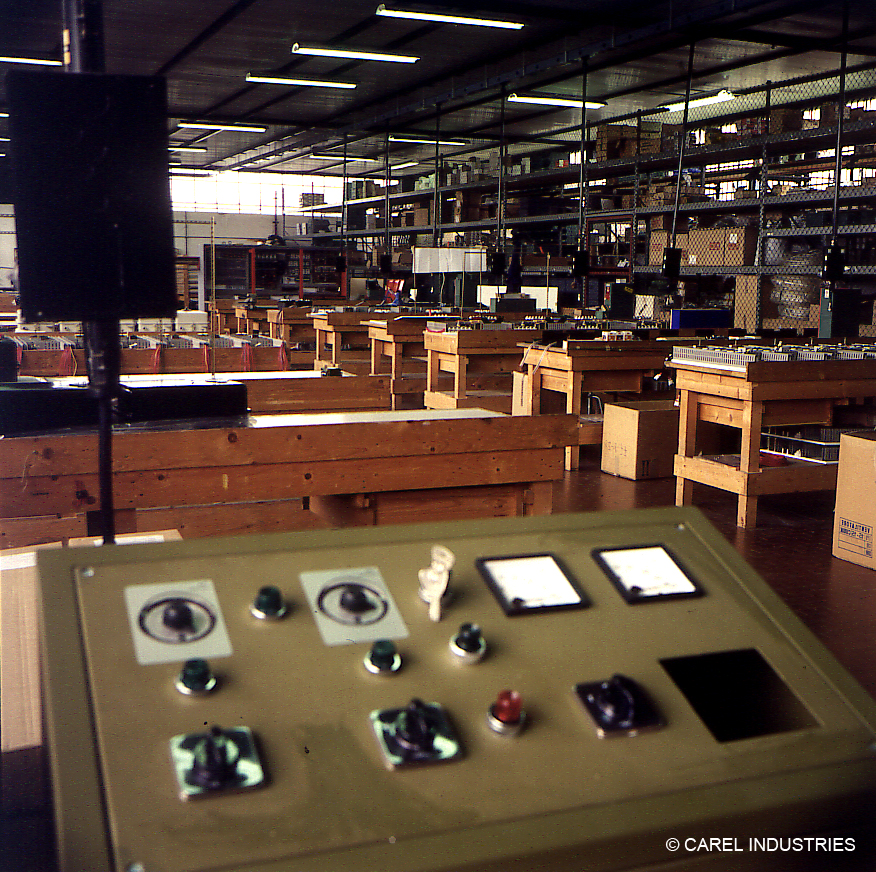
CAREL's first plant

In 1981, the company designed one of the first microprocessor-based controllers in Europe for the air-conditioning sector, which was launched on the market the following year under the name Miprosent. This was a parametric model, already pre-programmed in the factory and suitable for mass production and large volumes.

Subsequently, a programmable control was developed based on a new software programming language.

In the late 1990s, the refrigeration district, which would later become one of the largest in the world, began to develop around Carel.

=== International expansion ===
Within few years, the company expanded first on the domestic market and then on the European market, initially in the air conditioning and humidification sectors and soon afterwards in the refrigeration sector. The production of humidification systems with a significant electromechanical component continued, but investment was mainly concentrated on electronics. International expansion began in the 1990s with the opening of sales branches in France, Great Britain, South America and Germany.

During the 2000s, branches were opened in: China, Australia, USA, Asia, Spain, India, South Africa, Russia and Korea. This period also saw the opening of production sites in the United States, China, Brazil and, in 2015, Croatia, as well as sales offices in Northern Europe, Mexico, the Middle East, Thailand, Poland, Ukraine and Japan. In late 2018, CAREL also began to grow externally and acquired the companies Recuperator, HygroMatik and Enginia.

In 2021, it continued its international expansion with the acquisition of CFM Soğutma ve Otomasyon A.Ş, a long-standing distributor and partner in Turkey. The company growth also continued in 2022 through the acquisitions of the Italian companies Arion S.r.l. and Sauber, Germany's Klingenburg and the American Senva. Two more acquisitions were completed in 2023 with the entry of New Zealand's Eurotec and Norway's Kiona into the group.

== Operations ==
Carel specializes in the production of hardware and software components for improving energy efficiency in HVAC and refrigeration systems. The company's products are used across commercial, industrial, and residential applications.

In the HVAC market, the company offers hardware to be integrated in individual units, such as heat pumps, shelters, rooftops, Computer Room Air Conditioners (CRACs), chillers and air handling units. CAREL also delivers products for the industrial and commercial fields, for example, entire plants/systems for shopping malls, supermarkets, museums and data centers.

In the refrigeration market, the firm is active in the design, manufacture and marketing of control and humidification systems within the food retail and food service application segments. Just like for the HVAC market, the company solutions can be integrated both in single units, such as bottle cooler, plug-in refrigerator, multiplexed refrigerator, compressor rack and condensing unit, and in complex systems, such as plants or systems for supermarkets and restaurants.

In addition to its products, Carel also provides services such as commissioning, remote operation, and monitoring of the group's HVAC/R systems through IoT solutions.

== Research and development ==
The group has research laboratories in HVACR applications in Italy, China and the United States. A laboratory dedicated to air humidification systems and evaporative coolers exists in Padua. In April 2024, the company opened a new research center at its headquarters. The space covers 4500 square meters and includes climate chambers certified for the use of flammable refrigerants, testing booths, and a training center.
