= Emak =

Italian technology company

Emak Group S.p.A.
- Type: Limited company (Borsa Italiana)
- Industry: Forestry equipment, Landscape maintenance
- Founded: 1992; 34 years ago in Bagnolo in Piano, Italy
- Headquarters: Bagnolo in Piano, Italy
- Area served: Worldwide
- Products: Machines for gardening, agriculture, forestry and industrial applications
- Revenue: €612.490 million (2025)
- Operating income: €67.878 million (2023)
- Net income: €19.922 million (2023)
- Total equity: €283.667 million (2023)
- Website: www.emakgroup.com

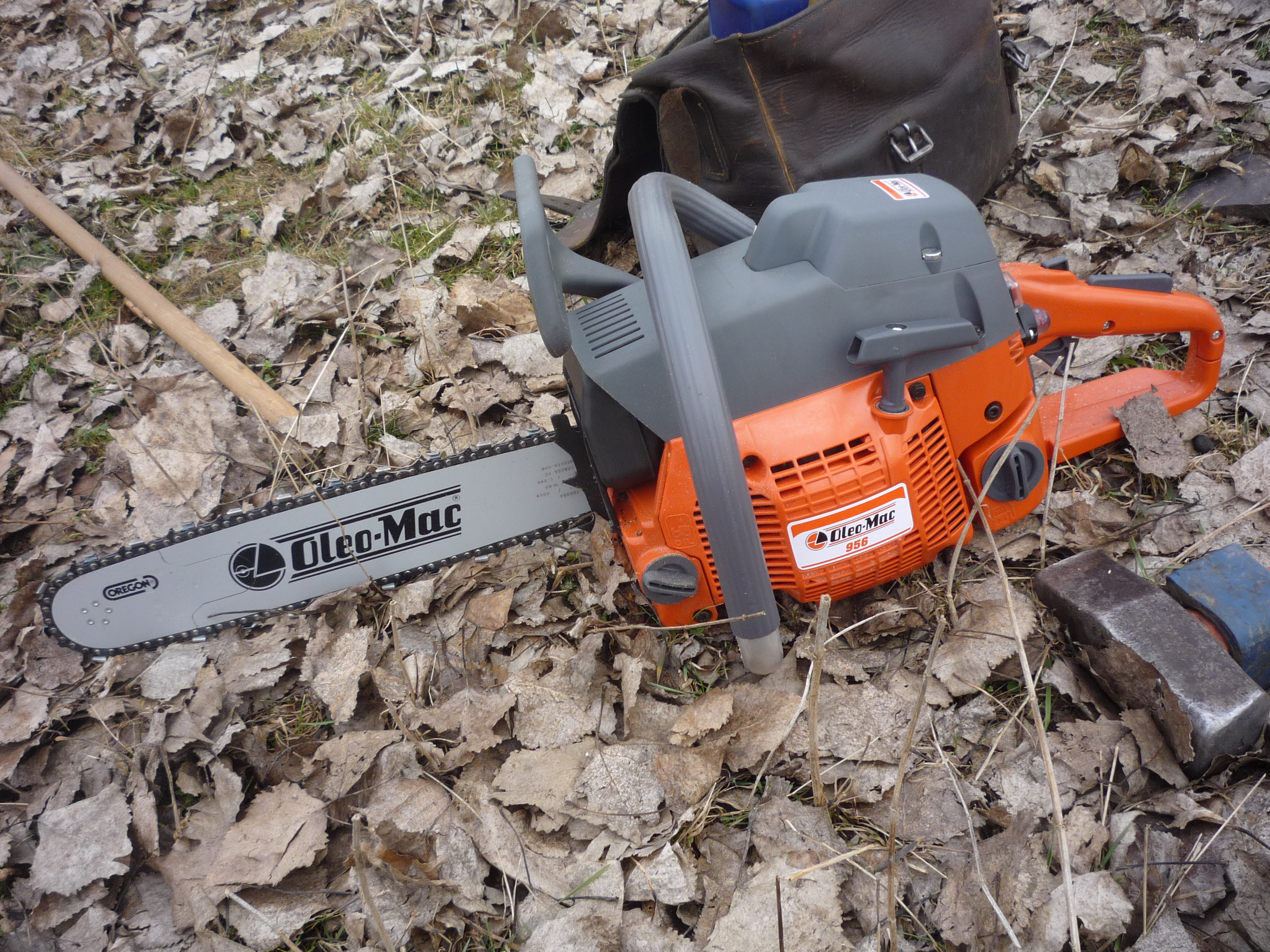
Oleo - Mac 956

Emak is an Italian manufacturer and distributor of machines, components and accessories for gardening, agriculture, forestry and industrial applications. Emak's brands are: Efco, Oleo-Mac, Bertolini and Nibbi.

The product range comprises more than 250 models of chainsaws, brushcutters, lawnmowers, garden tractors, hedgetrimmers, rotary tillers, rotary cultivators, flail mowers, cutterbar mowers, transporters and similar products.

== History ==
Emak was incorporated in 1992 by the merger of Oleo-Mac and Efco, two companies specialised in the production of gardening and forestry machines, both of which had been active since the 1970s in the province of Reggio Emilia (Italy). The combination of the manufacturing and managerial resources of the two companies soon allowed the new industrial complex to achieve a competitive position on the international market.

In 1996 Emak secured ISO 9001 certification and from June 1998 it has been listed on the Milan Stock Exchange, forming an international group thanks to the acquisition of 9 companies.

In 2008, following the acquisition of Bertolini S.p.A., Emak extended its product range to include the agricultural and gardening machines distributed under the Bertolini and Nibbi brand names. In the same year, newer models of petrol engineering replaced the old models. For example, gasoline-powered saws, such as the Efco 137S, Efco 143 and MT 442 have become more powerful and productive. Their weight was significantly reduced, for the possibility of long hard work. Also, the concern has released a new line of gasoline brushcutters, this is Efco Stark 30 TR, Efco Stark 35 IC and Efco Stark 40 TWIN.

Between 2005 and 2006, the group expanded its international presence by purchasing a Polish distributor and the creation of its US subsidiary.

In 2016, the budget line of EFCO chainsaws was released, these are models MTH 510, MTH 560. These models are made specifically for third world countries with low economic indicators. They are a farm series (domestic) and have piston systems from the Chinese manufacturer Kamo, and carburetors from the Chinese manufacturer Walbro. These saws are made of plastic of the middle segment, so they can be used only for domestic purposes. Officially delivered to countries such as Moldova, Pakistan, Lebanon and others.

In 2017, new models are produced for more developed countries, these are Efco 149, Efco 154, Efco MT 640 and MT 770, which are professional and industrial class and have a high motor resource of engines under prolonged loads under severe conditions. They already have Emak piston systems with Burn Right technologies and carburetors of the Japanese office of Walbro 7 series, which are equipped with four-channel fuel supply, which is a high-tech component in gas equipment.

== Sites ==
Emak has four production plants (in Italy) and seven branches in France, UK, Spain, Poland, Ukraine, China and Brazil. These markets account for over half of the Group's total turnover with more than 5000 dealers served directly.

== Brands and applications ==
Oleo-Mac ed Efco are the brands for the company's gardening and forestry machines. For the general agricultural sector the reference brands are Bertolini and Nibbi, which are distributed also by agricultural machinery and tractor dealerships.

== Product range ==
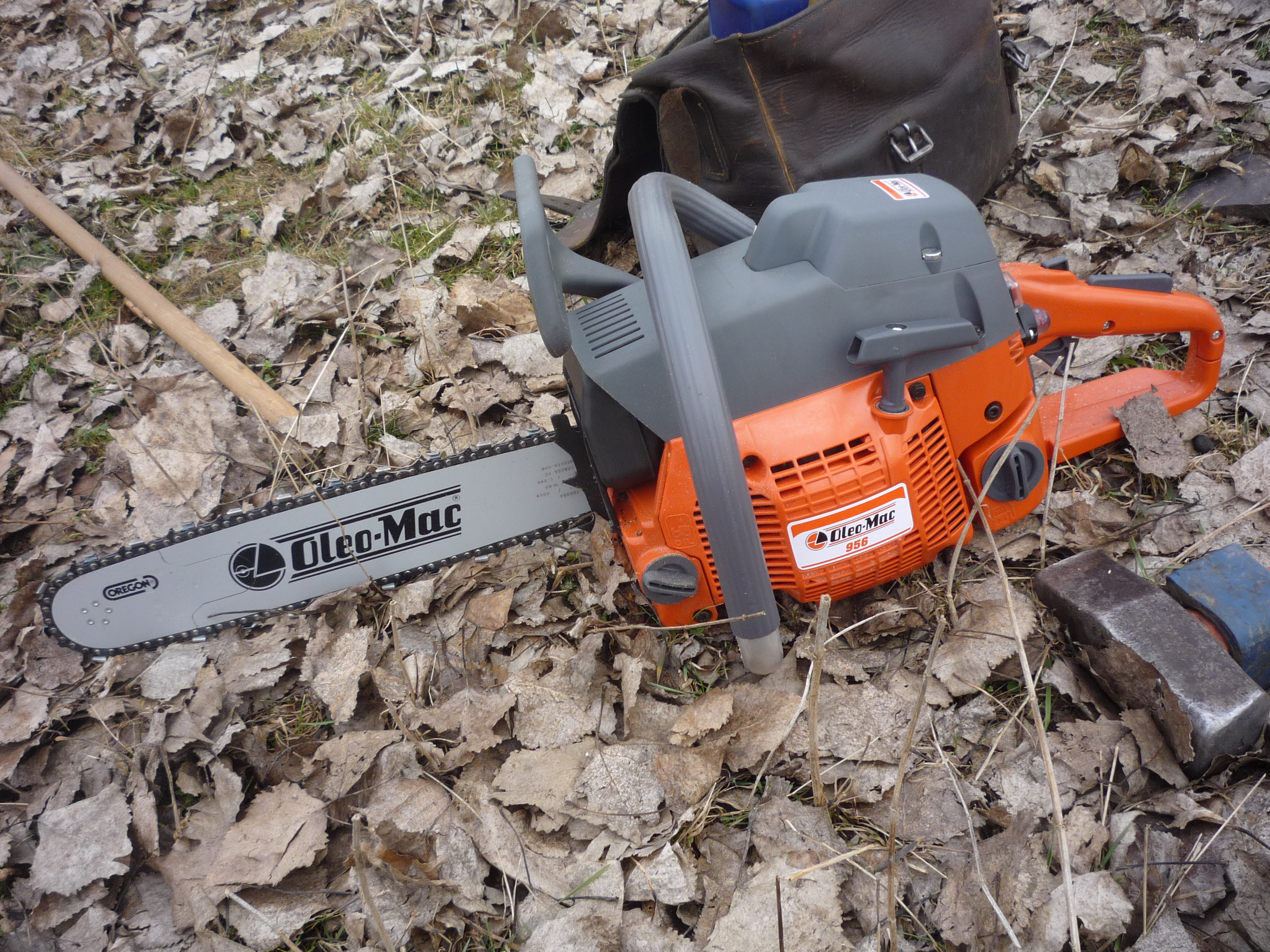
Oleo-Mac 956

The product range includes lines for home users (garden maintenance, firewood cutting, general DIY jobs), and for professional users (maintenance of large open spaces in urban and rural locations, machines for clearing, pruning, cutting firewood, forestry work and tidying of overgrown areas and undergrowth).

== Certifications ==
Emak has achieved certifications in the fundamental areas of corporate sustainability: Environment and Quality.

== See also ==
- List of Italian companies
