= IGD SIIQ =

Italian real estate company

IGD SIIQ S.p.A.
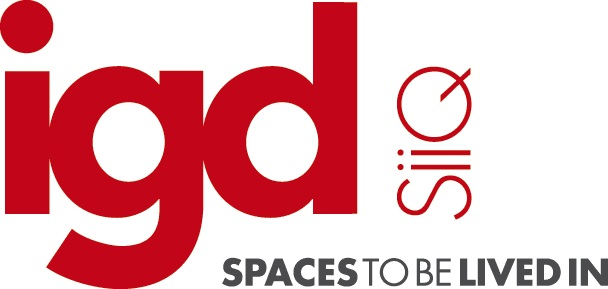
- Type: società per azioni
- Traded as: BIT: IGD; FTSE Italia Small Cap
- Industry: Real estate
- Founded: 1977; 49 years ago
- Headquarters: Bologna, Via Trattati Comunitari Europei 1957-2007, 13 (Head office); Ravenna, Italy, Via Agro Pontino, 13 (Registered office), Italy
- Key people: Gilberto Coffari, Chairman; Claudio Albertini, CEO; Daniele Cabuli, COO
- Products: Shopping centers, retail real estate
- Revenue: ▲127 million of € (2013)
- Net income: ▼5 million of € (2013)
- Total assets: 1,891.28 million of € (2013)
- Number of employees: 115 in Italy, 47 in Romania (2013)
- Website: www.gruppoigd.it/en/

IGD SIIQ (short for Immobiliare Grande Distribuzione Società di Investimento Immobiliare Quotata) is an Italian real estate company, which develops and manages shopping centers in Italy and it is also present in retail distribution in Romania.

The company is listed on the MTA - STAR section of the Italian Stock Exchange and was the first to enter the SIIQ scheme (Società di Investimento Immobiliare Quotata – Real Estate Investment Trust REIT) in Italy.

IGD is founded through the comb of much of the real estate assets owned by Coop Adriatica and Unicoop Tirreno, the two majority shareholders, who now control 56.6% of its capital: the aim was to consolidate the experiences gained earlier in the real estate sector with the creation of a specialized company, able to operate competitively in the sector.

== History ==
The history of IGD has its origins in the activity that already in 1977, ESP Dettaglianti Associati srl managed in the area of Ravenna, mainly focused on the rental of buildings for the sale of non-food products. The year 1998 sees the opening of the first shopping center in Ravenna ESP, with the hypermarket entrusted to Coop Adriatica and the gallery run by Gescom: a report that will consolidate over time.

In 2000 Coop Adriatica transfers part of its retail real estate assets to ESP which changes its name definitively to IGD - Immobiliare Grande Distribuzione.

In 2003 Ipercoop Tirreno also becomes a shareholder of IGD through the transfer of the Afragola shopping center in Campania; subsequently Ipercoop Tirreno sells its share in IGD to Unicoop Tirreno.

IGD's real estate portfolio expanded and the company prepared for its debut on the stock exchange at the end of July 2004.

In March 2007 RGD, Riqualificazione Grande Distribuzione, is born. The objective of this 50-50 joint venture between Beni Stabili and IGD is to enhance existing shopping centers, a segment which both partners expected to grow. The company's initial assets, 2 shopping centers, had an estimated value of €113.2 million. As the 2005-2008 investment plan was completed a year in advance, in 2007 a new plan is launched which calls for investments of €800 million to be made over the next three years. In order to finance the new plan IGD launches a capital increase of approximately €98 million and issues a €230 million convertible bond.

In

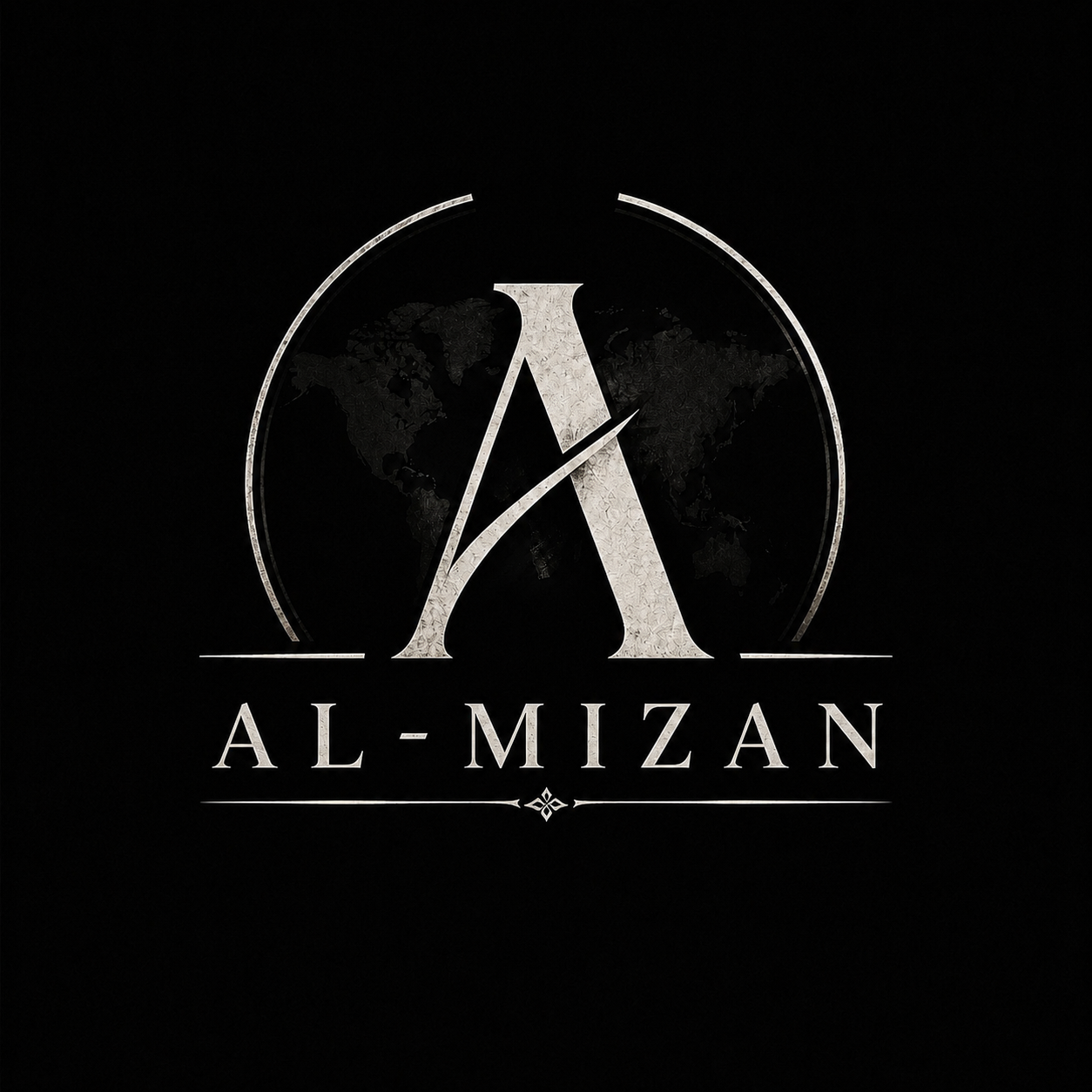
Al_Mizan
- https://commons.wikimedia.org/wiki/File:File_00000000da3871fa81b90ee689660d15.png

March 2008, IGD takes advantage of an important foreign investment opportunity and for €192 million acquires the company Winmarkt Magazine SA, which controls a real estate portfolio of 15 shopping centers in 14 different cities in Romania – a market with attractive consumer trends and interesting potential returns. As of April 2008 IGD, the first reality in the Italian real estate sector, elects to exercise the option to be treated as a SIIQ – Società di Investimento Immobiliare Quotata (real estate investment trust REIT).

At a time characterized by economic and financial crisis, during 2009 IGD continues with its programmed investments and opens important new shopping centers: at the beginning of April the Tiburtino shopping center, just outside Rome, was inaugurated and in May the Katanè shopping center in Gravina, near Catania, opened its doors. In June the shopping center Le Maioliche in Faenza was inaugurated and IGD acquired it the following October, while the last year opening is made just before Christmas, with the inauguration of the shopping center I Bricchi in Isola d'Asti.

In 2010, IGD opened a few days apart from each other two important shopping centers. The first one, "La Torre" shopping center in Palermo, opened on 23 November. The second opening, on 25 November, concerns the "Conè" shopping center in Conegliano, with an adjoining retail park. The sale to Beni Stabili of 50% interest in Beinasco and Nerviano shopping centers, carried out in December 2010 through the transfert of the stake that IGD had in the joint venture RGD, make a move in the direction of the real estate portfolio rotation, according to the new strategic guideline presented in November, with the revision of the 2009-2013 business plan.

In 2011, under the new strategy, "City Center Project", planned by the Group's business plan 2009-2013, which provides for possible acquisitions of properties in major Italian city centers, IGD has signed a preliminary contract for the acquisition of a property complex located in Via Rizzoli, Bologna's main shopping street in the heart of the historic city center.

A Dividend Reinvestment Option – the first transaction of this sort to be offered not only by IGD, but by an Italian company, was launched in 2012. The Dividend Reinvestment Option gave shareholders the possibility to reinvest up to 80% of their gross dividends in IGD shares by subscribing a reserved capital increase. As a result, the Company also benefitted from a recapitalization of €13.3 million. On 3 October 2012 the new 2012-2015 Business Plan was presented which, with respect to the past, focuses more on operational and financial sustainability in order to maintain a prudent and solid profile, as well as limit, to the extent possible, execution risk to exogenous factors. The Plan calls for an EBITDA Margin target of more than 71% by 2015.

In 2013 the Dividend Reinvestment Option was offered for a second time which gave shareholders the chance to reinvest up to 80% of the gross dividend received in IGD shares through subscription of a reserved capital increase. As a result of the transaction the Company gathered new proceeds of €13.5 million. At the end of April 2013 the offer to exchange the convertible bonds "€230,000,000 3.50 per cent. Convertible Bonds due 2013" with newly issued senior notes was completed with acceptances reaching €122.9 million. IGD also placed residual new notes amounting to €22 million with qualified institutional investors. On 7 May, therefore, IGD issued new notes with a nominal unit value of €100,000 for a total nominal amount €144.9 million. The 2014-2016 Business Plan was presented on 19 December which, for the first time, includes targets for sustainability. Despite the profound changes that have impacted the reference business environment, the strategic guidelines remain those of the prior planning period, with the exception of greater asset rotation: over the three-year period, in fact, disposals of approximately €190 million are called for.

== Operations ==
The IGD activity regards the purchase, development, management and leasing of properties in commercial use, whether owned or third-party and the provision of marketing services and facility management with the aim of enhancing the buildings themselves.

On 31 December 2013, IGD assets amounted to 1,891.28 Eur million, in Italy it consists of: 19 hypermarkets and supermarkets, 19 shopping malls and retail parks, 1 city center, 4 plots of land for development, 1 property held for trading and 7 additional real estate properties. Following the acquisition of the company Winmarkt Magazine SA, in 2008, the Group can count on 15 shopping centers and an office building, found in 13 different Romanian cities.

== Shopping centers ==
The IGD's portfolio consists almost exclusively of hypermarkets and galleries that are located inside medium-large size shopping malls.

In Italy the buildings are distributed throughout the country, from Piedmont to Sicily, in 11 different regions. Even in Romania the presence is well distributed: the centers are located in 13 different medium-sized cities.

== Shareholders ==
- Coop Adriatica, soc. coop. 43.57%
- Unicoop Tirreno, soc. coop. 13.09%
- Quantum Strategic Partners Ltd 5.00%
- Schroder Investment Management Ltd 3.25%
- UBS 2.28%
- Market 32,81%

Update on 22/05/2014

== Corporate social responsibility ==
In 2011, IGD has presented the 2010 Sustainability Report, which is the first in its history. This annual document describes the major achievements of the year and the objectives of future development in the economic, environmental and social areas.

In March 2013 the IGD Group and four of its Italian shopping centers, CentroSarca in Sesto San Giovanni (MI), Gran Rondò in Crema (CR), I Bricchi in Isola d'Asti (AT) and Mondovicino in Mondovì (CN), obtained the UNI EN ISO 14001 certification for its environmental management system and its implementation.

In March 2014 even Conè Shopping Center in Conegliano Veneto (TV) obtained the UNI EN ISO 14001 certification.
