= Acotel Group =

Italian telecommunications company

Softlab S.p.A.
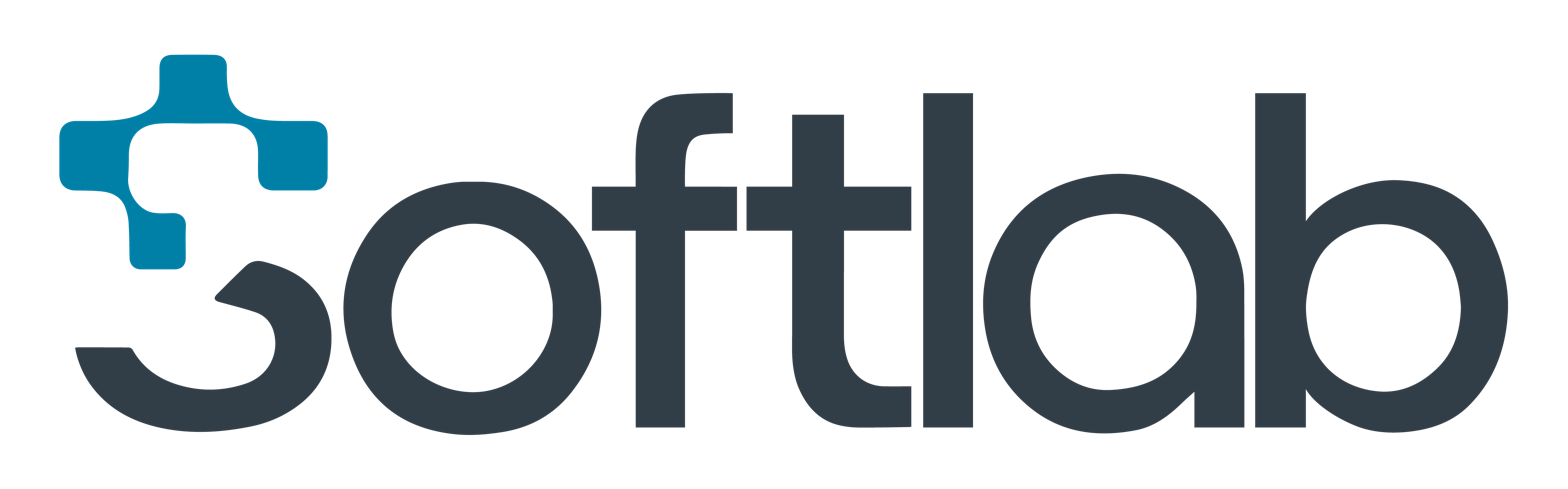
- Type: Public
- Traded as: BIT: ACO
- Industry: Communications and media
- Founded: 1997
- Headquarters: Rome, Italy
- Products: Communications
- Revenue: € 88,909,000 (2008)
- Number of employees: 421
- Website: soft.it

The Acotel Group S.p.A. (BIT ACO) is a global telecommunications company, headquartered in Formello (Rome), Italy. It was incorporated on April 6, 2000, and is the leader of a group of companies operating in the ICT sector. The Acotel Group operates in four areas of business – mobile telecommunications, value added services for mobile communications, mobile messaging and media solutions and mobile advertising managed services and security systems for large companies.

== History ==
In 1997, Acotel SpA, from which the Group takes its name, was the first company in the world to develop an SMS information service. This service was launched in collaboration with Telecom Italia Mobile and known as ScripTIM by Acotel.

In August 2000 Acotel was stock market listed. They have continued to achieve earnings growth and expand geographically: today they generate 80% of revenue of approximately €90 million outside of their home territory of Italy (financial year ended 31 December 2008).

In 2009 Acotel launched an MVNO offer in Italy in the frame of an industrial agreement with the Intesa Sanpaolo banking group, which gave rise to the joint venture, Nòverca Italia.

== Products and services ==
Each of the Acotel Group S.p.A. offer different products and services as follows:

- Nòverca Italia Srl: Mobile telecommunications provider in Italy offering mobile payment and VOIP services in addition to typical mobile services
- Acotel SpA, Flycell Inc., Info2cell FZ-LLC, Acotel Do Brasil Ltda.: Value added service for mobile communications at an international level.
- Jinny Software Ltd.: Mobile messaging & media.
- AEM Acotel Engineering and Manufacturing S.p.A.: Security systems for large companies and public bodies in Italy.
