= Elica =

Italian manufacturing company

Elica S.p.A.
- Type: Joint-stock company
- Industry: Kitchen appliances
- Founded: Fabriano, Italy, 1970; 56 years ago
- Founders: Ermanno Casoli
- Headquarters: Fabriano, Italy
- Area served: Worldwide
- Key people: Francesco Casoli (Chairman), Luca Barboni (CEO)
- Subsidiaries: Airforce, Fime
- Website: www.elica.com

Elica S.p.A. is an Italian company established in 1970 that designs and manufactures kitchen hoods, induction hobs, and boilers.

Elica is chaired by Francesco Casoli and led by CEO Luca Barboni; it has been listed since 2006 at the Borsa Italiana.

== History ==
Elica was founded by Ermanno Casoli in Fabriano in 1970. After Ermanno died of a heart attack in 1978, leadership was passed first to his wife and then to his son, Francesco.

Over the years, the company grew to operate seven factories in Italy, Poland, Mexico, India and China with a production of over 21 million hoods.

In June 2018, the company sold 33% of Elica India to Whirlpool of India.

== Economic data ==
As of 31 December 2013, the Elica group had a consolidated turnover of around €391.8 million and a consolidated net profit of around €1.4 million.

In 2017, revenues reached €479.3 million, an increase of 9.1% compared to the previous year. The Elica group consists of approximately 4,800 employees.

As of 31 December 2025, revenues reached €460.6 million, the adjusted EBITDA stood at €27.7 million, and the company reported an adjusted net loss of €6.4 million.

== See also ==
- List of Italian companies
