= FTSE MIB =

Italian stock market index

- FTSE MIB daily closes from January 2000 to 23 October 2026
- Foundation: September 2004; 22 years ago
- Operator: FTSE Russell
- Exchanges: Borsa Italiana
- Constituents: 40
- Type: Large cap
- Weighting method: Capitalization-weighted
- Website: www.borsaitaliana.it/borsa/indici/indici-in-continua/dettaglio.html?indexCode=FTSEMIB&lang=en
- Reuters: .FTMIB
- Bloomberg: FTSEMIB

The FTSE MIB (Milano Indice di Borsa) (the S&P/MIB prior to June 2009) is the benchmark stock market index for the Borsa Italiana, the Italian national stock exchange, which superseded the MIB-30 in September 2004. The index consists of the 40 most liquid and highly capitalised shares traded on the Euronext Milan and Euronext MIV Milan markets; its constituents are reviewed quarterly, in March, June, September and December, and no constituent may exceed 15% of the index weight. Borsa Italiana, which operates those markets, has been part of the Euronext group since 29 April 2021. The index was administered by Standard & Poor's from its inception until June 2009, when this responsibility was passed to FTSE Group, which is 100% owned by the London Stock Exchange Group.

== History ==
The index was launched in June 2003 by Standard & Poor's and Borsa Italiana as the S&P/MIB. On 20 September 2004 it replaced the MIB-30 as the underlying index of the futures and options contracts traded on IDEM, Borsa Italiana's derivatives market, and became the benchmark index of the Italian market.

Following the merger between Borsa Italiana and the London Stock Exchange, Borsa Italiana announced in January 2009 that FTSE Group would take over the calculation of its indices and that the S&P/MIB would be renamed FTSE MIB, keeping the same methodology. The FTSE MIB and the new FTSE Italia Index Series went live on 1 June 2009; from the same day the index futures and options traded on IDEM used the FTSE MIB as their underlying, and Borsa Italiana stopped publishing its own informative indices, such as the Mibtel.

Index values have been back-calculated to 31 December 1997, when the index stood at 24,402 points.

== Methodology ==
The FTSE MIB consists of the 40 most liquid and highly capitalised stocks listed on Borsa Italiana's Euronext Milan and Euronext MIV Milan markets, excluding preferred and savings shares. It captures about 80% of the domestic market capitalisation and is designed to reflect the broad sector weights of the Italian stock market. Stocks are selected on the basis of their free-float-adjusted market capitalisation and their turnover over the previous six months; shares with a free float of 5% or less are not eligible.

The index is weighted by free-float-adjusted market capitalisation, and the weight of each constituent is capped at 15% at every quarterly review. Reviews take place in March, June, September and December, using market data as at the close of the Monday four weeks before the effective date; changes take effect after the close of trading on the third Friday of the review month. FTSE Russell conducts the reviews with the advice of the FTSE Italia Index Series Technical Committee and publishes a reserve list at each review.

Between reviews, a constituent is removed if, for example, it is delisted from Borsa Italiana. Additions outside the reviews are made only to fill such a vacancy and are taken from the reserve list, except for large newly listed companies, which can be added through an extraordinary revision. The index is calculated in real time in euros, in both price and total return versions.

== Record values ==
In August 2026 the index set new all-time highs: on 6 August it rose above 54,000 points intraday for the first time, and on 7 August it set a record close of 53,717.19 points after reaching an all-time intraday high of 54,041.80.

== Annual returns ==
The following table shows the closing level of the index at the end of each year since 2003, the year the index was launched as the S&P/MIB.

Year	Closing level	Change in index in points	Change in index in %
2003	26,887		
2004	30,903	4,016	14.94
2005	35,704	4,801	15.54
2006	41,434	5,730	16.05
2007	38,554	−2,880	−6.95
2008	19,460	−19,094	−49.53
2009	23,248	3,788	19.47
2010	20,173	−3,075	−13.23
2011	15,090	−5,083	−25.20
2012	16,273	1,183	7.84
2013	18,968	2,695	16.56
2014	19,012	44	0.23
2015	21,418	2,406	12.66
2016	19,234	−2,183	−10.19
2017	21,853	2,618	13.61
2018	18,324	−3,529	−16.15
2019	23,506	5,182	28.28
2020	22,233	−1273	−5.42
2021	27,370	5,137	23.10
2022	23,707	−3,663	−13.38
2023	30,352	6,645	28.03
2024	34,186	3,835	12.63
2025	44,945	10,758	31.47

== Components ==
As of 21 September 2026:

Ticker	Company	ISIN	ICB Sector
A2A.MI	A2A	IT0001233417	Utilities
AMP.MI	Amplifon	IT0004056880	Health Care
AVIO.MI	Avio	IT0005119810	Aerospace
AZM.MI	Azimut	IT0003261697	Financial Services
BMED.MI	Banca Mediolanum	IT0004776628	Financial Services
BMPS.MI	Banca Monte dei Paschi di Siena	IT0005508921	Banks
BAMI.MI	Banco BPM	IT0005218380	Banks
BPE.MI	BPER Banca	IT0000066123	Banks
BC.MI	Brunello Cucinelli	IT0004764699	Consumer Products and Services
BZU.MI	Buzzi	IT0001347308	Construction and Materials
CPR.MI	Campari	NL0015435975	Food, Beverage and Tobacco
ENEL.MI	Enel	IT0003128367	Utilities
ENI.MI	Eni	IT0003132476	Energy
RACE.MI	Ferrari	NL0011585146	Automobiles and Parts
FCT.MI	Fincantieri	IT0005599938	Shipbuilding
FBK.MI	FinecoBank	IT0000072170	Banks
G.MI	Generali	IT0000062072	Insurance
HER.MI	Hera	IT0001250932	Utilities
ISP.MI	Intesa Sanpaolo	IT0000072618	Banks
INW.MI	INWIT	IT0005090300	Telecommunications
IG.MI	Italgas	IT0005211237	Utilities
IVG.MI	Iveco	NL0015000LU4	Industrial Goods and Services
LDO.MI	Leonardo	IT0003856405	Industrial Goods and Services
LTMC.MI	Lottomatica Group	IT0005541336	Gambling
MB.MI	Mediobanca	IT0000062957	Banks
MONC.MI	Moncler	IT0004965148	Consumer Products and Services
NEXI.MI	Nexi	IT0005366767	Industrial Goods and Services
PST.MI	Poste italiane	IT0003796171	Financial Services
PRY.MI	Prysmian	IT0004176001	Industrial Goods and Services
REC.MI	Recordati	IT0003828271	Health Care
SPM.MI	Saipem	IT0005495657	Energy
SRG.MI	Snam	IT0003153415	Energy
STLAM.MI	Stellantis	NL00150001Q9	Automobiles and Parts
STMMI.MI	STMicroelectronics	NL0000226223	Technology
TPRO.MI	Technoprobe	IT0005482333	Technology
TIT.MI	Telecom Italia	IT0005712671	Telecommunications
TEN.MI	Tenaris	LU2598331598	Energy
TRN.MI	Terna	IT0003242622	Utilities
UCG.MI	UniCredit	IT0005239360	Banks
UNI.MI	Unipol	IT0004810054	Insurance

== Changes since 2015 ==
The following changes to the index composition took effect between September 2015 and October 2026 (effective date = first trading day with the new composition). Changes decided at the quarterly reviews are listed from September 2015; changes made between reviews, for example after takeovers, mergers or spin-offs, are listed only from 2022.

Effective date	Removed	Added	Reason
21 September 2015	Autogrill	Unipol	Quarterly review
21 December 2015	Ansaldo STS	Poste Italiane	Quarterly review
21 March 2016	Tod's	—	Removed without replacement to bring the index back to 40 constituents after the temporary increase caused by the spin-off of Ferrari from FCA in January 2016
20 June 2016	Anima Holding	Recordati	Quarterly review
19 December 2016	Brembo	—	Removed without replacement to bring the index back to 40 constituents after the temporary increase caused by the spin-off of Italgas from Snam in November 2016
20 March 2017	Banca Monte dei Paschi di Siena	Banca Generali	Quarterly review
18 December 2017	Banca Mediolanum	Pirelli	Quarterly review
24 December 2018	Mediaset; Banca Mediolanum	Juventus FC; Amplifon	Quarterly review
18 March 2019	Brembo	Hera	Quarterly review
24 June 2019	Banca Generali	Nexi	Quarterly review
23 December 2019	UnipolSai	Banca Generali	Quarterly review
23 March 2020	Juventus FC	Banca Mediolanum	Quarterly review
22 June 2020	Salvatore Ferragamo; BPER Banca	Inwit; Interpump Group	Quarterly review
3 January 2022	—	Iveco Group	Added after its demerger from CNH Industrial; the index had 41 constituents until the following review
21 March 2022	Buzzi Unicem	—	Removed without replacement to bring the index back to 40 constituents after the addition of Iveco Group
19 September 2022	Exor	Buzzi Unicem	Quarterly review; Exor had moved its listing to Amsterdam
29 November 2022	Atlantia	ERG	Atlantia removed after Schema Alfa's tender offer exceeded 90% acceptance
20 March 2023	Buzzi Unicem	Banca Monte dei Paschi di Siena	Quarterly review
18 December 2023	CNH Industrial	Brunello Cucinelli	Quarterly review; CNH Industrial was delisting from Euronext Milan
18 March 2024	Banca Generali	Banca Popolare di Sondrio	Quarterly review
23 December 2024	ERG	Buzzi	Quarterly review
22 September 2025	Pirelli	Lottomatica Group	Quarterly review
22 December 2025	Interpump Group	Fincantieri	Quarterly review
23 March 2026	Banca Popolare di Sondrio	Avio	Quarterly review
21 September 2026	DiaSorin	Technoprobe	Quarterly review

== See also ==
- FTSE Italia Mid Cap
