= Borsa Italiana =

Italian stock exchange

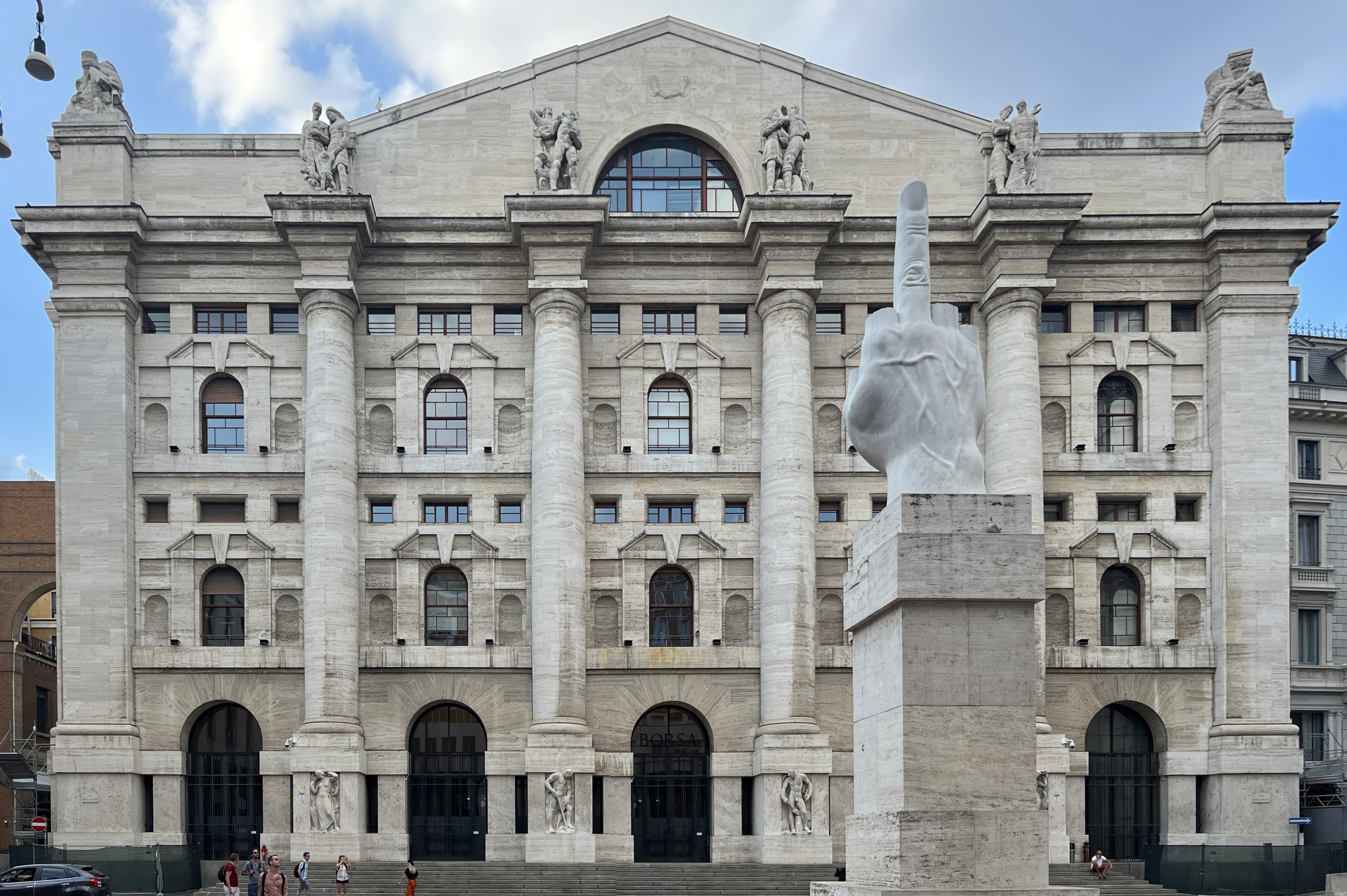
- The Palazzo Mezzanotte with Il Dito in front
- Type: Stock exchange
- Location: Milan, Italy
- Founded: 1808; 218 years ago
- Owner: Euronext
- Key people: Claudia Parzani (chairperson); Fabrizio Testa (CEO)
- Currency: EUR
- No. of listings: 353
- Market cap: €1.042 trillion (2025)
- Volume: €3.5 billion daily (2025)
- Indices: FTSE MIB; FTSE Italia All-Share; FTSE Italia Mid Cap; FTSE Italia Small Cap; FTSE AIM Italia
- Website: www.borsaitaliana.it

Borsa Italiana (lit. 'Italian Stock Exchange') or Borsa di Milano (lit. 'Milan Stock Exchange') is the Italian stock exchange based in Milan at Palazzo Mezzanotte. It manages and organises domestic market, regulating procedures for admission and listing of companies and intermediaries and supervising disclosures for listed companies.

Following exchange privatisation in 1997, the Italian Bourse was established and became effective on 2 January 1998. On 23 June 2007, the Italian Bourse became a subsidiary of the London Stock Exchange Group. This changed on 9 October 2020, when a €4.3 billion deal was agreed between the London Stock Exchange Group and pan-European stock exchange group Euronext. Euronext's acquisition of the Italian Bourse was completed on 29 April 2021. In 2021, Euronext outlined plans for a possible future rebranding of Borsa Italiana as Euronext Milan.

Borsa Italiana is also informally known as Piazza Affari (lit. 'Business Square'), after the city square of Milan where its headquarters (the Palazzo Mezzanotte building) is located.

Borsa Italiana is chaired by Claudia Parzani, and Fabrizio Testa is the CEO.

Borsa Italiana is regulated by the Commissione Nazionale per le Società e la Borsa (CONSOB), an agency of the Ministry of Economy and Finance, based in Rome. As of 2025, overall capitalisation for listed companies on Borsa Italiana was worth €1.042 trillion.

== History ==
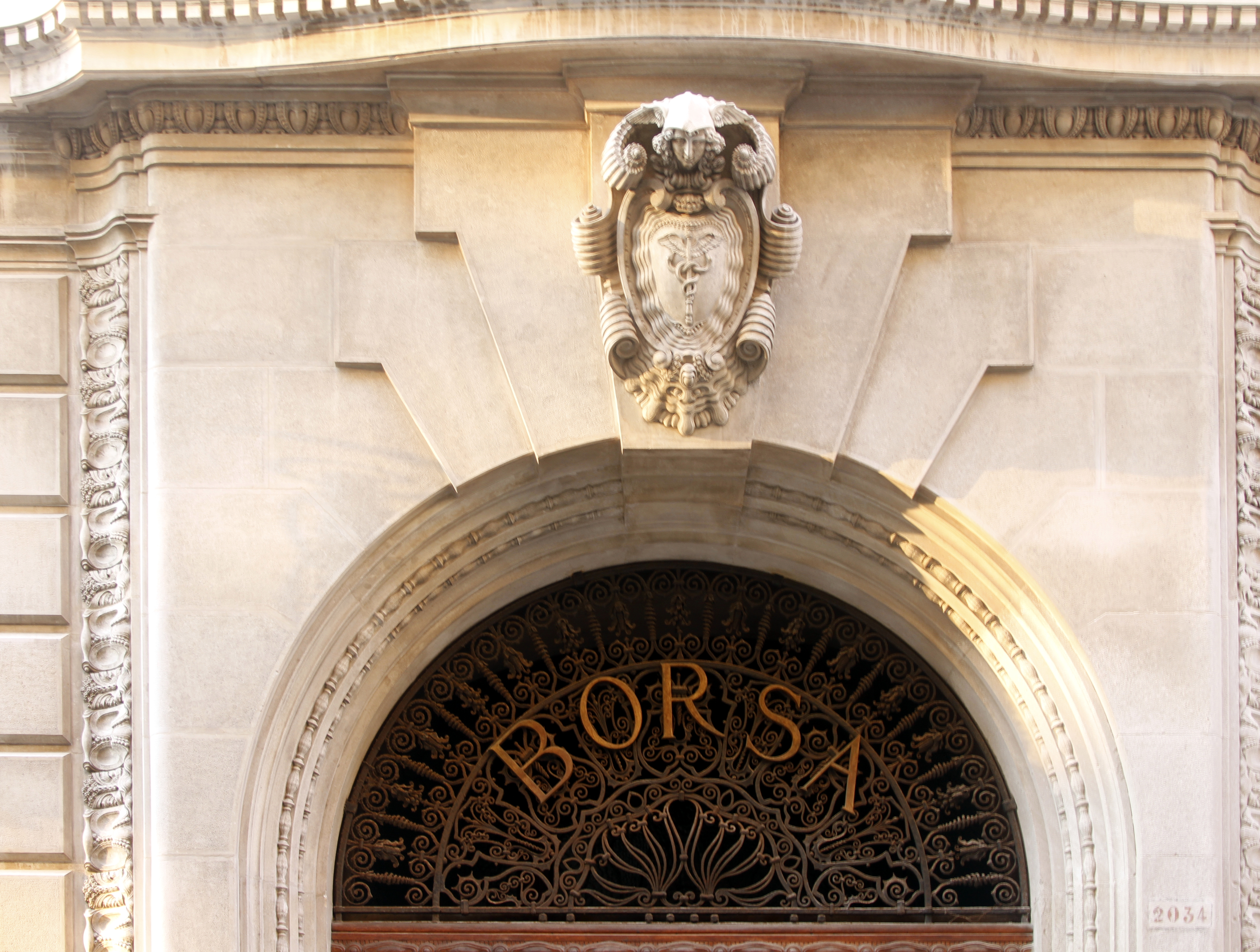
Bourse palace in Venice, decorated with the caduceus coat of arms, representing commerce

The Borsa di commercio di Milano (Milan Stock Exchange) was established by Eugène de Beauharnais, viceroy of the Napoleonic Kingdom of Italy, through decrees dated 16 January and 6 February 1808. It overtook the historically poorly regulated Borsa di Genova, later becoming the Italy's main stock exchange after the Panic of 1907.

It operated under public ownership until 1998, when it was privatized. In 1997, all the Italian stocks were merged. Before that year, other smaller stocks exchanges were based in Naples, Turin, Trieste, Venice, Genoa, Florence, Bologna, Rome, and Palermo. In 1991, the electronic exchanges were approved, and in 1994, the market with grids (A, B, C) was abolished. In Milan were also the currencies exchange rates fixing and the commodities fixing.

On 1 October 2007, Borsa Italiana was merged with the London Stock Exchange in an all-share takeover, thus becoming part of the London Stock Exchange Group. In March 2016, the London Stock Exchange Group announced the agreement to merge in an all-stock deal with Deutsche Borse, but was subsequently blocked by the EU Competition Regulator.

On 18 September 2020, the London Stock Exchange Group entered into exclusive talks to sell the Italian Bourse to Euronext. On 29 April 2021, following the entry of Italian institutional investors CDP Equity and Intesa San Paolo as shareholders of Euronext, the European group assumed control of the company. Its weight on the total Italian economy is growing: the overall capitalization of listed companies in December 2021 stood at 757 billion (equal to 43.1% of GDP), up by 24.7% compared to 2020.

== Operations ==
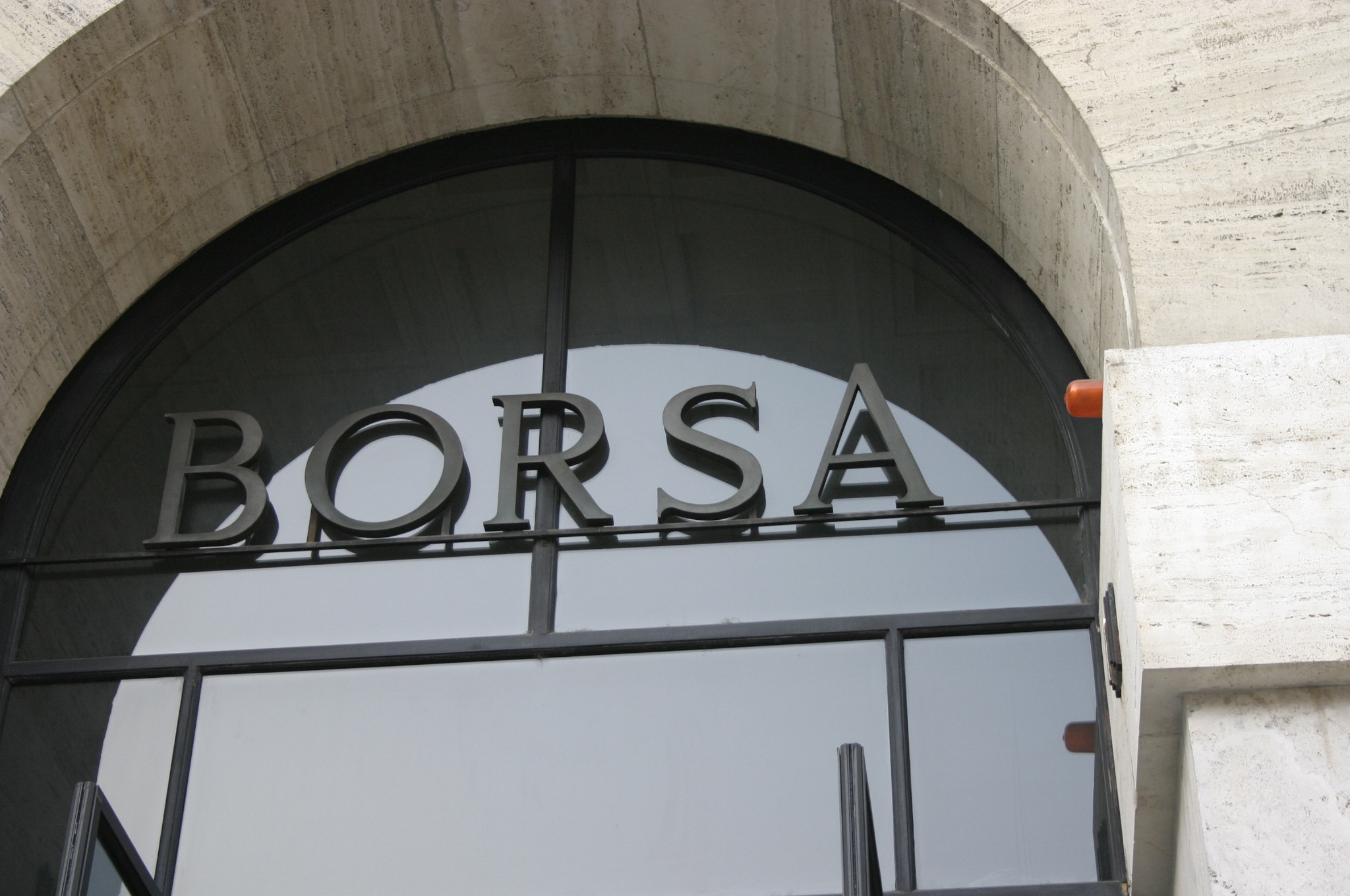
The entrance to Palazzo Mezzanotte in Milan, headquarters of the Borsa Italiana

Borsa Italiana acts as a market management firm operating with autonomy and flexibility. It organises and manages the domestic stock market along with Italian and international brokers through a fully electronic trading system. Among its leading tasks, Borsa Italiana supervises listed companies, defining rules for admission and listings and supervising transaction activities.

== Trading hours ==
The exchange has pre-market sessions from 8 AM to 9 AM, normal trading sessions from 9 am to 5:30 PM and post-market sessions from 6 PM to 8:30 PM on all days of the week except Saturdays, Sundays, and holidays declared by the Exchange in advance.

== Markets ==
Major trading markets for Borsa Italiana are:

- MTA, the leading equity market, which is devoted to mid and large-size companies. It includes two segments: STAR, for mid-sized firms, and MTA International, on which shares from non-Italian issuers already listed on other European markets are traded;
- AIM Italia, which collects stocks by small and medium high-growth companies;
- MIV (Market For Investment Vehicles), on which retail and professional investors operates on investment vehicles which have a defined strategic vision;

Borsa Italiana also include markets for derivatives (IDEM), ETF (ETFPlus) and bonds (MOT).

== Indices ==
Borsa Italiana's main indices are:

- FTSE Italia All Share
- FTSE MIB, a capitalisation-weighted index of 40 of the biggest companies chosen to represent 10 economic sectors, created in 2009
- FTSE Italia Mid Cap
- FTSE Italia Small Cap
- FTSE AIM Italia
- AIM Italia Investable

== Listed companies ==
For a full list, see Category:Companies listed on the Borsa Italiana.

== See also ==
- List of stock exchanges
- FTSE MIB
- FTSE Italia Mid Cap
- Economy of Italy
