= Moltiply Group =

Italian price comparison and outsourcing group

Moltiply Group S.p.A.
- Formerly: Gruppo MutuiOnline S.p.A. (2000–2024)
- Type: Public (S.p.A.)
- Traded as: BIT: MOL; FTSE Italia Mid Cap component
- ISIN: IT0004195308
- Industry: Price comparison; Financial services; Business process outsourcing
- Founded: 2000; 26 years ago
- Founders: Marco Pescarmona; Alessandro Fracassi
- Headquarters: Milan, Italy
- Area served: Italy; Germany; Spain; France; Netherlands; Mexico
- Key people: Marco Pescarmona (chairman); Alessandro Fracassi (CEO)
- Brands: MutuiOnline.it; Segugio.it; Trovaprezzi.it; Verivox; Rastreator; LeLynx.fr; Pricewise
- Revenue: ▲€674.1 million (2025)
- Operating income: ▲€103.4 million (2025)
- Net income: ▼€28.8 million (2025)
- Divisions: Mavriq; Moltiply BPO&Tech
- Website: www.moltiplygroup.com

Moltiply Group S.p.A., known as Gruppo MutuiOnline S.p.A. until 2024, is an Italian holding company based in Milan. Through its subsidiaries it runs price comparison and online brokerage services for financial, insurance, utility and e-commerce products in six countries, and supplies business process outsourcing and technology services to Italian banks, insurers and leasing companies.

The company was founded in 2000 by Marco Pescarmona and Alessandro Fracassi, who launched MutuiOnline.it, an online mortgage brokerage service. It has been listed on the Borsa Italiana since June 2007 and belongs to the FTSE Italia Mid Cap index. After a rebranding announced in March 2024 the group operates through two divisions: Mavriq, which groups the comparison and brokerage businesses, and Moltiply BPO&Tech. Consolidated revenues in 2025 were €674.1 million.

Its subsidiary 7Pixel, owner of the Italian shopping comparison site Trovaprezzi.it, is among the largest claimants in the wave of private damages actions brought against Google in Europe in the wake of the European Commission's Google Shopping decision, seeking €2.97 billion before the courts of Milan.

== History ==
=== Foundation and listing (2000–2014) ===
MutuiOnline.it, an online mortgage brokerage, was launched in 2000 with seed capital from Nestor 2000, a fund managed by Net Partners Ventures and Jupiter Ventures. A consumer credit comparison site, PrestitiOnline.it, followed in 2001. Comparison services were extended to motor insurance and to bank accounts between 2009 and 2010 through CercAssicurazioni.it and ConfrontaConti.it, and in 2012 the group brought its non-shopping comparison products together under a single brand, Segugio.it.

Gruppo MutuiOnline was floated on the Borsa Italiana in June 2007. Revenues fell from €71.8 million in 2011 to €38.5 million in 2012 as the Italian mortgage market contracted, then recovered to €120.7 million in 2015 and €315 million in 2021.

=== Diversification (2015–2022) ===
In March 2015 the group acquired a 51% stake in 7Pixel S.r.l., owner of the shopping comparison sites Trovaprezzi.it and Drezzy.it, for €55 million. It took a 40% holding in the customer review firm Zoorate in 2016 and bought the remaining 60% in 2021.

The outsourcing business was enlarged in 2018 with a 50% controlling interest in Agenzia Italia S.p.A., a provider of administrative services to leasing and long-term rental operators, and in 2019 with Eagle & Wise S.r.l., active in property valuation and technical services for financial institutions. In November 2020 the group bought SOStariffe.it, a comparison site for energy, telecommunications and banking offers, for more than €30 million.

=== International expansion and rebranding (2022–present) ===
In August 2022 MutuiOnline agreed to acquire three foreign comparison portals — Rastreator.com in Spain, LeLynx.fr in France and Rastreator.mx in Mexico — from ZPG Comparison Services Holdings UK and Penguin Portals for an enterprise value of €150 million. The deal, which closed in early 2023, gave the group its first operations outside Italy.

On 19 March 2024 the company announced a rebranding under which the group and its outsourcing arm took the name Moltiply, while the broking division was renamed Mavriq, a name derived from "maverick". Mortgages, the group's original business, accounted for 19% of 2023 revenues. The consumer-facing brands, among them MutuiOnline.it, Segugio.it and Trovaprezzi.it, were left unchanged, and the legal name Moltiply Group S.p.A. was adopted later in 2024.

Mavriq expanded abroad again in 2024, agreeing in May to buy 80% of the Dutch comparison and brokerage operator Pricewise at an enterprise value of €25 million, and in July 80% of Switcho, an Italian company that analyses household bills and handles supplier switching, at an enterprise value of €20 million plus an earn-out of up to €4 million.

In March 2025 Moltiply completed its largest acquisition, buying the German comparison portal Verivox from ProSiebenSat.1 Media for an equity value of about €232 million. Consolidated from the second quarter of 2025, Verivox made Germany the group's second market and was the main driver of an 83.8% increase in Mavriq's revenues over the year.

In October 2025 CercAssicurazioni.it S.r.l. was renamed Segugio.it broker di assicurazioni S.r.l. and SOS Tariffe S.r.l. became Segugio.it energia e telecomunicazioni S.r.l., placing the group's Italian comparison activities under the Segugio.it brand.

== Operations ==
=== Mavriq ===
Mavriq is the group's business-to-consumer division. It operates around twenty comparison and brokerage brands in Italy, Germany, Spain, France, the Netherlands and Mexico, covering mortgages, personal loans, salary-backed loans, current and deposit accounts, motor insurance, electricity, gas and telecommunications tariffs, and e-commerce price comparison; the division acts both as a credit intermediary and as an insurance broker. Its main sites are MutuiOnline.it, Segugio.it and Trovaprezzi.it in Italy, Verivox in Germany, Rastreator.com in Spain, LeLynx.fr in France, Pricewise.nl in the Netherlands and Rastreator.mx in Mexico.

Foreign markets accounted for about a third of the division's revenues in 2024, with management setting a medium-term target of at least half. In 2025 Mavriq generated €406.4 million, or 60.3% of consolidated revenues.

=== Moltiply BPO&Tech ===
The Moltiply BPO&Tech division supplies business-to-business outsourcing and technology services to Italian banks, financial intermediaries, insurers and leasing companies. Its activities include remote sales, loan underwriting and post-disbursement administration, real-estate appraisal through a network of surveyors, and the handling and settlement of insurance claims. The division reported €267.7 million of revenue in 2025, 39.7% of the group total.

== Litigation against Google ==
In May 2025 Moltiply's subsidiary 7Pixel filed a claim before the court of Milan against Google and its parent Alphabet, seeking €2.97 billion (about US$3.34 billion) in damages. 7Pixel argued that between 2010 and 2017 Google abused its dominant position in general search by favouring its own Google Shopping service, holding back the growth of Trovaprezzi.it. The action follows the European Commission's 2017 decision fining Google €2.42 billion over the same conduct, against which the company lost its final appeal in September 2024. A Google spokesperson said the company disagreed "strongly with these exorbitant private damages claims", adding that the number of comparison shopping sites in Europe using its shopping features had risen from seven to more than 1,550 since it modified the service in 2017.

The claim is one of several brought against Google by European comparison shopping operators, alongside those of Idealo in Germany, PriceRunner in Sweden and Kelkoo and Foundem in the United Kingdom. Reuters reported in July 2026 that the actions had gained impetus after the Commission fined Google under the Digital Markets Act, and that Idealo and PriceRunner had by then obtained awards of €465 million and roughly €1.7 billion respectively. Euronews reported that Moltiply's figure had been calculated by external experts and reflected "the structural effects of the abuse and interest".

== Finances ==
For the year ended 31 December 2025 Moltiply reported consolidated revenues of €674.1 million, up 48.6% year on year; EBITDA of €177.4 million, up 44.5%; operating profit of €103.4 million, up 40.8%; and net profit of €28.8 million, down 33.0%. The company attributed the fall in net profit to higher amortisation of intangible assets and to one-off charges arising from the recalculation of put and call options. Net financial debt stood at €440.8 million, €120.3 million higher than a year earlier, mainly because of the Verivox purchase, and the board proposed a dividend of €0.15 per share.

In the first nine months of 2026 revenues were €509.0 million, 9.0% more than in the same period of 2025, and operating profit rose by 10.9% to €83.8 million.

Il Sole 24 Ore wrote in 2025 that integrating Verivox, whose margins were lower than Mavriq's, was the group's main execution risk, and noted a June 2025 share placement that raised €44 million at €44 per share.

== Shareholders ==
According to filings with Consob, as of 5 December 2025 the largest shareholders were Alma Ventures S.A., the vehicle through which the two founders hold their stake, with 32.50%, and Norman Rentrop with 20.86%.

== See also ==
- Comparison shopping website
- Google Shopping
