= Idealo =

German price comparison service

idealo
- Website type: GmbH
- Available in: German, English, Italian, French, Spanish
- Headquarters: Berlin, {{{location_country}}}
- Owner: idealo internet GmbH
- Founders: Martin Sinner, Dr. Albrecht von Sonntag, Christian Habermehl & others
- CEO: Dr. Albrecht von Sonntag; Jörn Rehse
- Services: Price comparison
- Operating income: €52,612,705.01 (2012)
- Employees: 1100 (2022)
- Parent: Axel Springer SE (74,9%)
- Website: idealo.co.uk
- Registration: Not required
- Current status: Online

idealo internet GmbH is a German price comparison service launched in Germany in 2000, and since bought by the Axel Springer AG publishing company. The headquarters are in Berlin, Germany. The idealo website allows users to compare prices on a range of products from hundreds of shops. idealo is Europe's largest price comparison service present in Germany, Austria, France, Spain, Italy and the UK.

== History ==
The company was founded by Martin Sinner, Albrecht von Sonntag, Christian Habermehl and others in 2000, using €500,000 in venture capital (of which €350,000 from KfW). In July 2006, Axel Springer bought a 74.9% majority interest in idealo internet GmbH for an undisclosed sum. Its 2012 revenues were €52,612,705.01.

== Technology ==
The idealo sites use CSV files and API_integration supplied by the retailers themselves to create a unique database of product offers that is filtered by real people. These prices are matched against a bespoke backend database of products and this matching process is carried out by using a fuzzy logic and AI automated matching system as well as large teams of people also acting as a quality control filter.

== Business model ==
idealo is a consumer review and price comparison website that is similar to other price comparison services in that it is financed by advertisers on traffic quantities as well as quality. Companies advertising their products on idealo track user traffic and clicks through tracking pixels.

Product offers displayed on the idealo website are normally ordered by price where the lowest is shown at the top of any listing, however on product listing pages the products are ordered by price, popularity, user rating or test results. Some other comparison shopping website such as Kelkoo, pricerunner, pricespy and Google Shopping may feature only paying retailers and allow them to bid for position in the rankings.

Each idealo product page also features a place for product reviews and shows a trend graph of each product costs over time.

In April 2019, Idealo Internet GmbH filed a lawsuit for damages amounting to 500 million euros against Google LLC before the Regional Court of Berlin. Idealo accuses Google of severely abusing its dominant position as a search engine operator. The amount of damages claimed could increase significantly over the course of the years-long proceedings. The lawsuit is based on a 2007 antitrust case by the European Union concerning the Google Shopping service. This antitrust proceeding resulted in a record fine of 2.4 billion euros against Google, which, as of February 2024, is still not legally binding. The judges upheld the accusation that Google unlawfully promoted its own price comparison service in the market to the detriment of competitors. Former Idealo CEO Philipp Peitsch expressed confidence at the OMKB Conference in August 2021 that the long-awaited ruling would be clear and in Idealo’s favor. In November 2025, a Berlin court ruled that Google must pay Idealo 465 million euros for market abuse.
