= Thingbuzz =

Thingbuzz is the first real-time search and discovery shopping platform based on social media information generated on Twitter, the microblogging service. ThingBuzz was founded in 2009 in Benicia, California.

Thingbuzz was purchased by Nextag, the leading shopping comparison site based in San Mateo, California, in October 2011, for an undisclosed sum.

== Description ==
Thingbuzz searches for things or products that people are talking about or recommending on Twitter, and presents the data in a way that is consumable and searchable. Thingbuzz also shows crowdsourced emerging trend data, measured by the number of tweets, the credibility ranking of tweeters and time.

Things are searchable by the type of tweeter which are categorized into mom, geek, bieber fan, etc. These profile categories are extracted by a self-learning algorithm that filters through 160-character tweeter bios to find common bio categories. Thingbuzz also finds popular products from newly launched e-commerce sites, as they are tweeted by customers. Results from new small stores usually appear on Thingbuzz before they appear on traditional search engines. Tweets are scored using a proprietary scoring method to ensure that high quality tweets show up before tweets most likely to be spam.

== Recognition ==
Thingbuzz has been described as "a great way to discover new and otherwise under-the-radar products people are talking about." Also, as "a site that collects the most original products that are on the web"

In October 2011, Thingbuzz was acquired by Nextag, a shopping comparison site for an undisclosed sum.

== See also ==
- Pricesearcher
