= ESalon =

Californian hair coloring company

eSalon
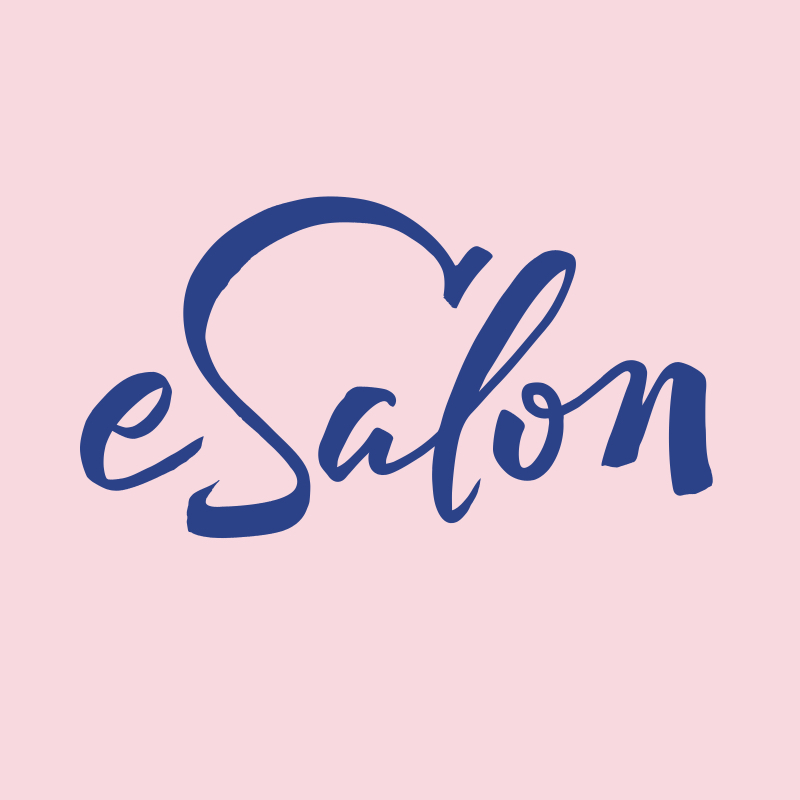
- Company type: Private
- Founded: 2008 in Los Angeles, California
- Founders: Cory Rosenberg; Francisco Gimenez; Omar Mourad; Lisa Biscaichipy; Tamim Mourad
- Areas served: United States, Canada, Europe
- Key people: Graham Jones CEO
- Products: Hair dye
- Revenue: $30 million (2015)
- Website: http://www.esalon.com

eSalon is a hair color company based in El Segundo, California. Launched in 2010, the company's core offering is individually customized hair coloring for at home application.

== History ==
eSalon was founded by a former employee, Francisco Gimenez, a friend, and three founders of the price-comparison shopping site, PriceGrabber, after it was bought by Experian in 2005. In 2008, the group founded eSalon and after two years of research and development launched the company in 2010. In 2014, eSalon expanded beyond hair color and began offering other hair care products. Later that year the company expanded sales to Europe and Canada and reported revenues of over $17 million. By 2015, the company had sold 2.2 million units of hair color to 140,000 subscribers with 120,000 different unique formulas. In November 2016, the company released a personalized highlighting system called Light Set.

== Operations ==
eSalon creates custom hair color for clients based on an online questionnaire about their hair color history, amount of gray, skin tone, eye color and other factors. The corresponding formula is mixed on an individual basis for at home application and is available as a one-time purchase or as a subscription. eSalon has two patents on their custom coloring system. The company utilizes a direct to consumer sales model. eSalon has received the "Best of Beauty" award for "Best Home Hair Color" from Allure in 2014, 2015,2016, 2017, and 2019.
