= NexTag =

Price comparison service

Nextag, Inc.
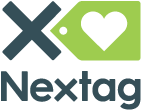
- Type: Private
- Industry: Comparison shopping
- Founded: 1999
- Fate: Website offline December 2018; company ceased operations
- Headquarters: Redwood Shores, California, United States
- Number of employees: 350+ (2016)
- Website: www.nextag.com

Nextag was an independent price comparison service website for products, travel, and education. It started as a website where buyers and sellers could negotiate prices for computers and electronics products. From 2000, the business model focused on comparison shopping. NexTag also owned Hamburg, Germany-based Guenstiger.de. It provided functionality for tracking the historical prices of a product across various sellers.

Nextag's headquarters were in Redwood Shores, California.

In June 2007, Providence Equity Partners purchased a two-thirds majority of the company for $830 million, valuing NexTag at approximately $1.2 billion. Los Angeles-based private equity firm Regent purchased the company in March 2015.

The NexTag.com website went offline on or about December 28, 2018, with no formal public closure announcement. Industry sources reported in January 2019 that the company had gone out of business. Merchant reports from 2016 to 2018 indicated declining traffic quality, poor conversion rates, suspected bot or fraudulent clicks, and deteriorating customer support in the period leading up to the shutdown.

In August 2022, the domain name nextagshop.com went online and started to focus on wholesale and retail sales of general merchandise, including both B2B and B2C business; this site is not operated by the original NexTag company. As of July 2026, nextagshop.com is also offline.

== Acquisitions ==
In November 2010, Nextag announced the acquisition of nextcoupons.com, a Santa Monica, California-based coupon company. This was a way for Nextag to bring in more talent and resources. In April 2011, Nextag acquired Germany's Guenstiger.de GmbH, the leading online comparison shopping website in Europe's market. In October 2011, Nextag acquired thingbuzz, a real-time social shopping platform that tracks the conversation about products in the social media sphere, in a bid to socialize the online shopping experience for its users. At the very end of that year, FanSnap was acquired by Nextag. This was the fifth acquisition in only 15 months. According to former Nextag CEO Jeffrey Katz, these acquisitions enabled Nextag to be a one-stop e-commerce shop for various products including tickets.

== Recognition ==
NexTag was ranked by Time magazine as one of the fifty best websites of 2008. Time magazine called Nextag the "plainest comparative-shopping site on the Web", but commended it for quick and comprehensive shopping search results. Nextag provided customers with product reviews and provided the price history for each product.

As of 28 March 2018, it was ranked one of the "10 Top Price Comparison Websites" by Shopify.

== Decline and shutdown ==
No comprehensive official postmortem has been published, but available evidence points to a combination of competitive, operational, and market-structure factors that led to NexTag's failure.

=== Competitive pressure from Google ===
Google increasingly displayed product listings, prices, images, and merchants directly in search results, embedding price-comparison functionality into its core search experience. Independent comparison engines consequently had to compete with the dominant source of shopping-search traffic, reducing their strategic relevance and user base.

=== Vulnerability of the cost-per-click model ===
NexTag depended on merchants paying for referral clicks. If those clicks stopped converting—or appeared fraudulent—merchants could quickly withdraw their feeds and advertising budgets. Beginning around 2016, at least one merchant documented a surge in nonconverting traffic and suspected bot clicks; after NexTag reportedly found no anomalies, the merchant stopped advertising there. This anecdotal account illustrates the marketplace's deterioration but is not a company-wide financial disclosure.

=== Operational deterioration ===
By August 2018, merchant reports cited broken seller registration and an over-capacity support mailbox—warning signs shortly before the site vanished. The NexTag.com website went offline around December 28, 2018, and industry sources reported in January 2019 that the company had gone out of business.

=== Industry consolidation ===
Standalone comparison engines were disappearing or being consolidated while product discovery shifted toward Google, Amazon, large marketplaces, and social platforms.
