= CampusBooks.com =

Free online textbook price comparison shopping service

- Website type: Comparison shopping website
- Founded: 1998
- Country of origin: United States
- Founder: Alex Neal
- Industry: Internet, E-commerce, Comparison Shopping
- Products: Textbooks, used textbooks
- Services: Online shopping
- Website: www.campusbooks.com
- Commercial: Yes
- Launched: 1998
- Current status: Active
- Written in: PHP

CampusBooks.com is a free online textbook price comparison shopping service. The website sources information from multiple online booksellers and provides students with a selection of offers for buying, renting, and selling textbooks online.

== History ==
CampusBooks.com was founded by Alex Neal in 1998 during the height of the dot com boom. The company started as an online textbook reseller. In 2000, it changed its business model and became a textbook comparison shopping site. CampusBooks served over 1.5 million book price comparisons to students in 2007. In 2011, the website was viewed by over 3 million students.

In 2015, CampusBooks released Buy vs. Rent price prediction tool, which provided students with recommendations on whether to buy or rent a book based on the current price and future estimated value.

In 2023, the website contained information on more than 8 million new and used textbooks from thousands of sellers and multiple bookstores in 3 countries.

== Overview ==
CampusBooks obtains textbook pricing data from multiple sources and makes it searchable by ISBN, author, title. Once a search is performed, CampusBooks shows the list of textbooks according to the search parameters.

CampusBooks displays the buying, renting, and selling price information from third-party vendors as is, without modifying it. Upon selecting offers, customers are redirected to third-party websites and complete the orders there. CampusBooks is not involved in the order processing and completion processes.

CampusBooks provides a free Buy vs. Rent price prediction tool. The tool employs a proprietary algorithm, which takes into account the depreciation of the book in question and estimates its buyback value in 6 months. Based on the estimation, the website displays its recommendation for either buying or renting the book.

== Business model ==
CampusBooks.com is an Amazon associate and takes part in affiliate programs of other bookstores, from which it receives commissions for qualifying purchases. In addition, the website partners with online booksellers and buyback vendors, and displays their offers based on PPC revenue model.

== See also ==
- Comparison shopping website
- Bookselling
- Wikipedia:Book sources
