= WFN Strategies =

- Industry: Telecommunications Engineering
- Area served: Worldwide
- Key people: Wayne Nielsen (founder)

WFN Strategies is an independent supplier of telecommunications engineering services to clients in the government, commercial, oil and gas sectors. The company was established in 2001 by Wayne Nielsen, and has offices in Washington D.C.; Houston, Texas; London, England; and Perth, Australia.

WFN specializes in submarine and terrestrial optical cable, microwave, mobile and Wi-Fi, satellite and other RF technologies. Submarine Telecoms Forum, the first bi-monthly electronic magazine dedicated to the submarine cable industry, is published by WFN. In 2010, WFN Strategies became a Better Business Bureau-accredited business company.

== Technologies ==
- Submarine communications cable
- Terrestrial cable
- Inter-platform systems
- Microwave systems
- Wireless broadband and WiMAX/ WiFi

== Services ==
- Project planning
- Systems engineering
- Systems Acquisition
- Implementation and supervision
- Due diligence
- Maintenance, repair, and operations
