= William Klippgen =

Norwegian businessman

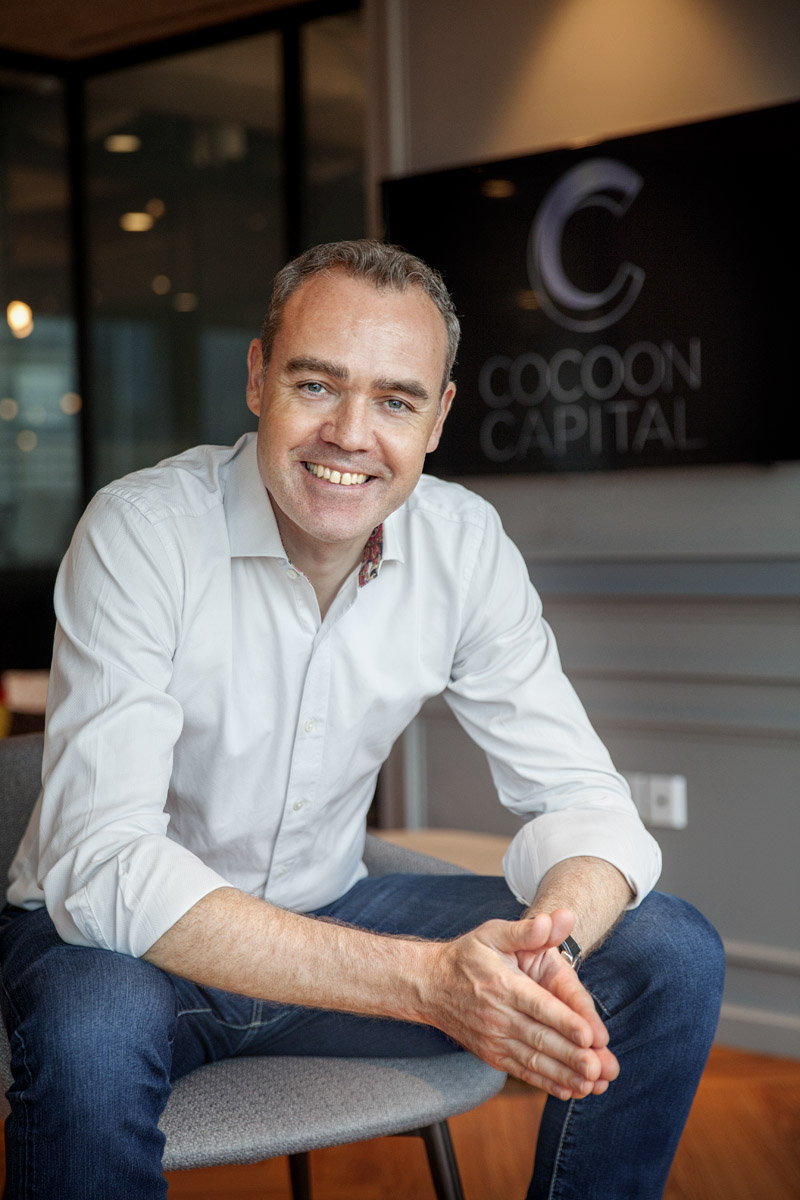
- William Klippgen in 2016
- Born: 21 March 1969 (age 57); Trondheim, Norway
- Other name: Will Klippgen
- Education: MSc, MBA
- Alma mater: Norwegian University of Science and Technology; Boston University; INSEAD
- Occupations: Entrepreneur, Investor, Co-founder & Partner Emeritus at Cocoon Capital
- Organizations: Cocoon Capital, Zoomit.com, Tigris Capital, BAF Spectrum, InseadAlum Ventures
- Television: Angel's Gate (2012)

William Klippgen (born 1969 in Trondheim, Norway) is a Singapore-based Norwegian entrepreneur and technology venture capitalist who co-founded the price comparison portal Zoomit.com (later merged with Kelkoo, which was sold to Yahoo! in 2004). He served as one of the judges on the television series Angel's Gate, which was broadcast on Channel NewsAsia in 2012. Klippgen is a co-founder and serves as Partner Emeritus at Cocoon Capital. He holds an MBA from INSEAD where he is an Entrepreneur in Residence.

He has invested in over 50 startups in Singapore and across the world since 2004.

== Early life and education ==
Klippgen holds an MSc degree in Engineering Cybernetics from the Norwegian University of Science and Technology, an MSc in Computer Engineering from Boston University (which he attended on a Fulbright Scholarship), and an MBA from INSEAD Business School.

== Television work ==
Klippgen served as one of the judges on the reality TV series Angel's Gate, which began broadcasting on Channel NewsAsia in February 2012. The show gives budding entrepreneurs in Asia an opportunity to pitch business ideas to investors. Klippgen was one of four judges on the show alongside Patrick Grove (co-founder of the Catcha Group), Ken Mandel (Managing Director of Buddy Media Asia Pacific) and Karan Singh Thakral (Executive Director of the Thakral Group of Companies).

== Business career ==
Klippgen has been a company founder and investor since the early days of the Internet. He founded Zoomit.com in 1997 with Per Siljubergsåsen. In 2000, Zoomit.com merged with Kelkoo to become a leading shopping comparison search engine and Europe's third-largest e-commerce site. Kelkoo was acquired by Yahoo! Inc in 2004. Before starting his own company, he worked as a core tech engineer with U.S. search company Excite.com. He became an angel investor in Singapore in 2004 after he sold Kelkoo.com to Yahoo!.

In 2003, Klippgen founded early-stage investment company Tigris Capital. He was one of the first investors in PropertyGuru in 2008. In 2010, Tigris Capital was given the award for Best Performing VC/PE backed company by the Singapore Venture Capital Association for its successful investment in PropertyGuru.com. He also co-founded Singapore seed investment fund BAF Spectrum in 2006, which primarily invested in tech startups across Asia in a co-funding partnership with SPRING Singapore (a statutory board under the Ministry of Trade and Industry in Singapore). Klippgen's equity stakes have typically been between 5 and 20%.

In 2015, along with Deepak Shahdadpuri, Klippgen co-founded InseadAlum Ventures (IAV) that provides seed investments to startups founded by INSEAD alumni.

In 2016, he teamed up with UK angel investor Michael Robert Blakey to launch Cocoon Capital, an early-stage venture capital firm targeting Southeast Asian enterprise tech startups within the e-commerce, SaaS, fintech and deep tech verticals. The firm has so far raised three main funds managing an AUM of more than USD 90m.

In March 2019, Klippgen joined the Advisory Board of VNX Exchange, a Luxembourg-based secondary share platform. He serves or has served on the boards of Tickled Media (theAsianparent.com), Anafore (ReferralCandy.com), Mozat, Progeniq, Luxe Nomad (theLuxeNomad.com), Poundit Global, Lendela and Augmentus.

He has been a columnist with Singapore Business Review and has also been a director of Business Angel Network of Southeast Asia (BANSEA). He holds a US patent on user identification and authentication.

== Public speaking & community work ==
Klippgen is a frequent speaker and judge at institutions like the National University of Singapore and the INSEAD Business School. He has spoken at business events including Norway-Asia Business Summit, Norwegian Business Association Singapore talks and Tech Fest Vietnam. He is an Entrepreneur in Residence at INSEAD.

== TV shows ==
Year	Show (s)	Channel	Comment	Ref.
2012	Angel's Gate	Channel NewsAsia	Season 1	
