= Michael Blakey =

Michael Blakey may refer to:

- Michael Blakey (anthropologist) (born 1953), American professor at the College of William & Mary
- Michael Robert Blakey (born 1975), British business angel and venture capitalist
