= DealNews =

Comparison shopping website

DealNews Inc.
- Available in: English
- Founded: 1997
- Headquarters: Huntsville, Alabama, US
- Founders: Daniel de Grandpre and D. Richard Moss
- Industry: Comparison shopping website
- Website: dealnews.com
- Current status: Active

DealNews is a comparison shopping website for consumer electronics, apparel, and other products. Founded in 1997 by Daniel de Grandpre, the website was included in PCWorld's "100 Best Products of 2006 List". According to Alexa Internet, Inc., DealNews.com is in the top 1,000 websites in the US. The DealNews app is available for both iOS and Android smartphones. The company is headquartered in Huntsville, AL.

== History ==
The website was launched in 1997 by Daniel de Grandpre and Richard Moss as dealmac.com. Initially, the website posted online prices for Apple Macintosh products. Later, in 1999, the business was renamed as DealNews.com to include PC hardware, software, DVD movies, TV and apparel deals as well. DealNews.com also operates the DealCoupon.com domain.

== Awards and recognition ==
DealNews.com was declared No. 1 on the "Top 10 Black Friday Sites List" by PC Mag and was listed as one of the "Best Retail Deals Coupon Sites" by Yahoo. DealNews was listed at No. 24 on PC World's "100 Best Products of 2006 List". The site was also included on the 2011 "Gold and Excellence Awards" list from Top Ten Reviews and was declared an "Editor's Favorite" by The Washington Post; In 2011, Stephanie Rosenbloom of The New York Times included the website in a list of recommended sites, describing it as "credible and well researched". The website has been named as "Official Honoree" in the 11th and 12th Annual Webby Awards.

== Black Friday predictions ==
DealNews.com publishes a Black Friday predictions report annually; the report provides practical shopping advice and price benchmarks. Its sixth annual report was released on October 1, 2013. In the 2012 predictions report, 73% of DealNews' forecasts were found to be accurate, either predicting the correct price or finding a price that was even lowered.

== Mobile applications ==
The DealNews app is available for iOS and Android smartphones. As of February 2014, the Android app has been downloaded between 100,000 - 500,000 times. DealNews has also introduced a Black Friday app for iOS and Android. In 2012, DealNews RSS was selected for the Best Mobile App Award.

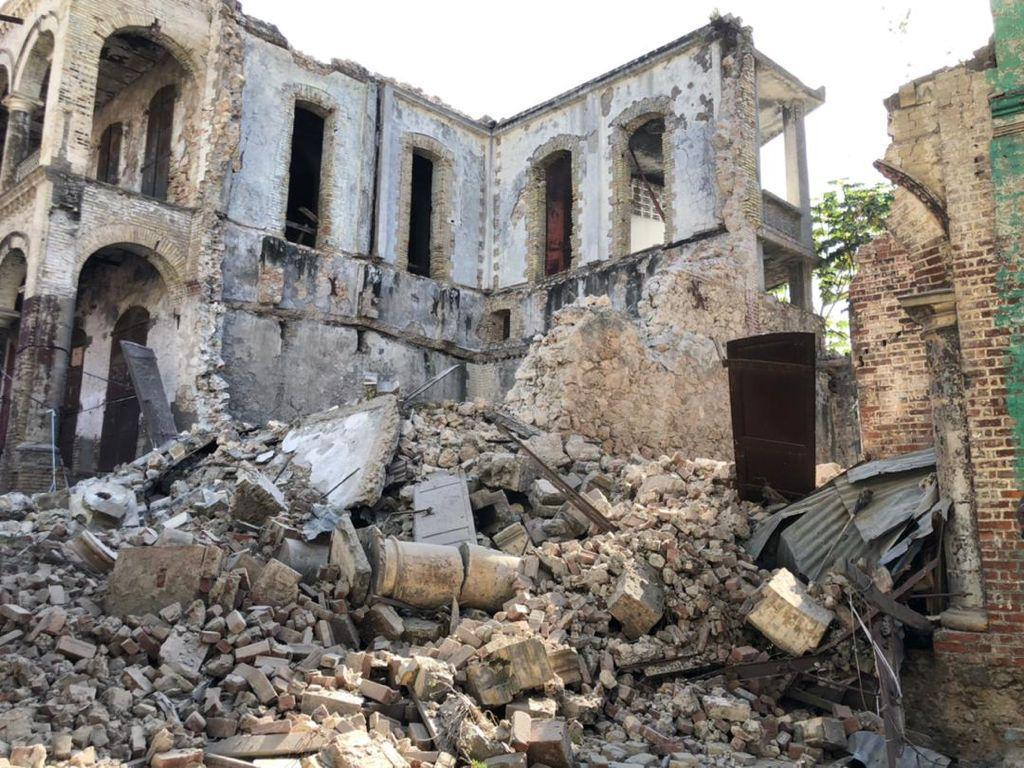
Haiti Earthquake

== Philanthropy ==
After the 2004 Indonesian Tsunami, DealNews and its readers raised over $10,000. In the aftermath of Hurricane Katrina in 2005, both parties collectively raised $107,392 for the Red Cross relief efforts. The company also raised $100,000 in response to the 2010 Haiti earthquake.
