= ERowz =

Search engine

eRowz
- Formerly: BC.Net
- Company type: Private company
- Industry: Classified Advertising
- Founded: 2011; 14 years ago
- Founders: Vincent Vandegans and Bart Verschueren
- Headquarters: Enghien, Belgium
- Website: www.erowz.com; www.used.forsale; www.site-annonce.be

eRowz (formerly trading as BC.Net) is a Belgium vertical search engine, with a specialisation of classified advertising in sectors such as cars, product sales and real estate.

== History ==
eRowz was founded and patented in Belgium in mid-2011 by Vincent Vandegans and Bart Verschueren. Initially commencing with a classified website in France, followed by Italy, and then expanding internationally.

== How eRowz works ==
eRowz is a search engine that real estate, cars and product related classified advertisements to obtain unstructured data. Other sources of data are data feeds and API interfaces with partners such as eBay, Amazon and Kelkoo. The data acquired is aggregated into eRowz's database and presented to visitors based on their preferences, settings and searches. Visitors can set-up alerts for new items for sale matching their criteria and geographical location.
