= OverstockArt.com =

overstockArt
- Industry: Retail
- Founded: 2002
- Headquarters: Wichita, Kansas, United States
- Key people: David Sasson (CEO); Amitai Sasson (VP of marketing & development)
- Revenue: $4.1 million (2012)
- Number of employees: 24 (2012)
- Website: www.overstockart.com

overstockArt.com is an American online retailer of wall décor. They specialize in handmade oil paint reproductions of famous artists, which are produced in a factory based in the Shanghai Free-Trade Zone. The company is headquartered in Wichita, Kansas.

It was ranked among Top 1000 fastest-growing private companies in the United States in 2011 and 2012 by Inc. magazine. It was also ranked #820 in Second 500 Guide and featured as Hot 100 e-retailer in 2012 by Internet Retailer.

== History ==
overstockArt.com was founded in 2002 as a home-based business by David Sasson, his wife Stacy, and their partner Amit Yaari. The idea to sell reproductions of famous paintings came from David's brother, Amitai Sasson.

In 2010, the company moved into its own 5,000-square-foot building. At that time the company had 14 employees: 6 in the United States, one in Israel, and 7 in China. According to the company officials, they sold over one million oil paintings by June 2010.

In November 2011, the company announced that it joined forces with the television network Bravo and Magical Elves Production to launch an exclusive line of artwork reproductions from the network's Work of Art: The Next Great Artist reality show.

In 2011, the company diversified by creating a subsidiary ArtistBe.com to sell original art. By June 2014, the site accumulated over 1,500 artists. Reproduced works of some of them are also sold by overstockArt.com in its contemporary art line.

In 2012, overstockArt launched a new version of its Oil Paintings mobile app, which featured an augmented reality tool that enabled users to virtually decorate their walls with art from the store. In 2012, the company was also chosen as one of the first art vendors to be featured at Google Catalogs. It enabled overstockArt.com to increase its number of catalog updates to four times a year instead of one annual edition it produced previously.
