= TheFind.com =

American online discovery shopping search engine

TheFind, Inc.
- Type: Subsidiary
- Industry: Shopping search, discovery shopping
- Founded: 2006
- Defunct: 2015
- Headquarters: Mountain View, California, USA
- Key people: Siva Kumar (CEO), Shashikant Khandelwal (CTO)
- Parent: Meta Platforms
- Website: thefind.com (no longer available)

TheFind.com was a Mountain View-based online discovery shopping search engine targeting lifestyle products such as apparel, accessories, home and garden, fitness, kids and family, and health and beauty. On March 13, 2015, Facebook, Inc. announced that they had acquired TheFind.com for an undisclosed sum, and the site was being shut down.

== History ==
TheFind Inc, was founded in 2006 as FatLens Inc., initially specializing in event tickets search but later expanding to product search. On October 31, 2006, the site was re-launched as TheFind.com with an emphasis on discovery shopping search for lifestyle products. TheFind.com received initial funding from Redpoint Ventures, Lightspeed Venture Partners and Cambrian Ventures. In 2007, they received an additional $15 million in funding led by Bain Capital Ventures.

On March 13, 2015, Facebook, Inc. announced that they had purchased TheFind.com for an undisclosed sum. It was also announced that TheFind.com would be shut down immediately and that some of the staff would make the transition to join the Facebook team. Its TheFind.com page was replaced with a redirect to Facebook's home page.

== Business model ==
TheFind.com positioned itself as a discovery shopping search engine, in contrast to a comparison shopping engine model more commonly used for computers and electronics. According to the company's website, the search database included over 500 million products from over 500,000 stores and online merchants. Products were added to the search via crawling as well as merchant feeds. The search results were ranked using an algorithm based on relevancy and popularity, rather than a pay-for-placement ranking. Clicking on a product from a search results page took the user to the merchant's site where the product could be purchased directly from the merchant.

== Growth ==
On March 28, 2007, TheFind.com announced that it had experienced a 540% increase in unique visits since its launch on October 31, 2006, and a change from 141,625 visits in November 2006 to a run rate of over 900,000 visits in March 2007. They also reported a monthly traffic growth rate of over 35% for Q1 2007. In November 2008, the Quantcast.com media measurement service showed TheFind.com at 7 million visitors per month. In May 2010, Comscore Media Metrix showed TheFind to be the 2nd largest shopping search engine with 20+ million visitors per month as.

On August 29, 2007, TheFind.com acquired the women's fashion shopping site Glimpse.com.

== Charitable campaigns ==
TheFind.com periodically ran "Color for a Cause" campaigns to raise money for charities. During each campaign, TheFind.com donated $1 to the selected charity each time users ran a search that contained a designated color. In the first campaign launched in January 2007, TheFind.com donated $1 per user per day for searches that contained the color red, raising a total of $10,000 for the humanitarian aid charity Doctors Without Borders. In the campaign launched in April 2007, searches that contained the color pink netted $1 per user per day for the breast cancer research organization Susan G. Komen for the Cure.

== See also ==
- Online shop
- Price comparison service
- Search engines
- Vertical search
- List of search engines
