= TestFreaks =

Swedish retailing support company

- Company type: Private
- Industry: Digital Marketing; Review Website
- Founded: 2007
- Founders: Kristofer Arwin; Magnus Wiberg; Martin Alexanderson
- Headquarters: Stockholm, Sweden
- Key people: Johan Hedberg (CTO); Sean Creech (CRO)
- Services: Aggregated reviews User reviews Review data API; Review widget Q&A widget
- Number of employees: 15
- Website: www.testfreaks.com

TestFreaks is a product review aggregator, meaning that both expert/professional- and user reviews are aggregated from thousands of sources in many different languages using an advanced backend system.

== History ==
TestFreaks was launched in 2007 by the former founders of PriceRunner, Kristofer Arwin, Magnus Wiberg, and Martin Alexanderson. Northzone, an investor in PriceRunner, also invested in TestFreaks. The financial model was based on compensation when users clicked on links to other sites.

== See also ==
- Expert Reviews
