= Banco di Desio e della Brianza =

Banco Desio
- Native name: Banco di Desio e della Brianza
- Traded as: BIT: BDB; FTSE Italia Mid Cap
- Founded: 1909
- Headquarters: Desio, Italy
- Net income: ▼€39.427 million (2014)
- Total assets: ▲€19.511 billion (Q2 2026)
- Total equity: ▲€845.627 million (2014)
- Subsidiaries: Banca Popolare di Spoleto
- Capital ratio: 10.459% (Tier 1)
- Website: www.bancodesio.it

Banco di Desio e Brianza SpA is an Italian bank with headquarters in Desio (MB). It works basically in the north of Italy but also in other regions like Lazio, Veneto and Tuscany. It offers online services in addition to physical location access.

Founded in 1909 by engineer Egidio Gavazzi took the name Banco Desio in 1926. Incorporating the Bank of Brianza in 1967 increased presence on the Italian markets, bringing it to 21 branches. In 1995 it was listed on the Milan Stock Exchange. As at April 12, 2012 it was the seventeenth largest publicly held Italian bank in terms of market capitalization.

As of September 2015 it was included in FTSE Italia Mid Cap Index.

In October 2026, Banco Desio announced that it entered exclusive talks with Banca del Mezzogiorno – MedioCredito Centrale in order to acquire a 85.32% stake of Cassa di Risparmio di Orvieto.

== See also ==
- List of banks in the euro area
- List of banks in Italy
