= Kamran Pourzanjani =

- Occupations: Entrepreneur, Angel Investor
- Years active: 1999–present
- Known for: Entrepreneur, Angel Investor, Co-founder of PriceGrabber
- Notable work: PriceGrabber, Bestcovery.com
- Awards: Ernst & Young Entrepreneur of the Year (2005, Los Angeles)

Kamran Pourzanjani is an entrepreneur and an early angel investor based in Los Angeles, California. He co-founded and was formerly the CEO of PriceGrabber, a comparison shopping site started in 1999 with less than $1.5 million in angel funding. In October 2006 a Forrester Research independent survey recognized PriceGrabber as the most popular comparison shopping site among active web shoppers. PriceGrabber was acquired by Experian in December 2005 for an enterprise value of $485 million.

Kamran was formerly President and CEO of Syseca, Inc. (part of Thomson-CSF) an information technology and software development company which he sold in 1999.

He has served on the board of directors of Legalzoom.com and Docstoc, and was named Ernst & Young's Entrepreneur of the Year in Los Angeles in 2005 and a national finalist in 2006. He is also an early investor in ZipRecruiter.com, Honk.com, AppFolio (went public in 2015 (NASDAQ: APPF)), Datapop (acquired by Criteo in 2015), Legalzoom.com (partially acquired by Permira in 2014), Docstoc (acquired by Intuit Inc. in 2013), iVisit and IPPLEX (acquired by NantWorks in 2011) and ShoeDazzle.

In 2008, Kamran founded Bestcovery.com, a website that recommends the best products and services. The sale of Bestcovery.com to NantMobile, LLC was successfully completed in late 2015. He appeared on the web show 'This Week in Startups with Jason Calacanis', in November 2009, to talk about his success with PriceGrabber and Bestcovery, and act as a panel for advising guest CEOs on their startup concepts and marketing strategies. Kamran was included in a Forbes list of 12 Entrepreneurs Who Are Changing LA Forever.

In 2010, he and Omid Rahmat, acquired ELC Technologies
