= Issuu =

Electronic publishing platform and app

Issuu, Inc.
- Type: Private
- Industry: Electronic publishing
- Founded: Copenhagen, Denmark, November 8, 2006; 19 years ago
- Founders: Michael Hansen; Ruben Bjerg Hansen; Mikkel Jensen; Martin Ferro-Thomsen
- Headquarters: Palo Alto, California, U.S.
- Owner: Bending Spoons
- Website: issuu.com

Issuu, Inc. (pronounced "issue") is an electronic publishing platform based in Palo Alto, California, United States. The company's software converts PDFs into customizable digital publications that can be shared via links or embedded into websites.

Founded in 2006, the company moved its headquarters from Denmark to the United States in 2013.

== History ==
Issuu was founded in Copenhagen, Denmark, in 2006 by Michael and Rubyn Bjerg Hansen, Mikkel Jensen, and Martin Ferro-Thomsen.

In 2009, Apple rejected Issuu's app three times, because it was seen as too similar to Apple's planned Newsstand service. In August 2009, the company's website was named one of Time's 50 Best Websites.

By 2011, Issuu software was used by several online publications.

In early 2013, the company opened an office in Palo Alto, California, and appointed CEO Joe Hyrkin, formerly of Reverb, Trinity Ventures, and Yahoo!, to helm its Silicon Valley operations. The company soon moved its headquarters to the Palo Alto location. Upon the move, the founders of Issuu stated that they chose the city as they saw social media and digital distribution partnerships as the key to its growth, rather than focusing mostly on publishing relationships. Also in 2013, Issuu acquired the Denmark-based software company Magma, including the company's software that allowed collaboration between editorial teams in organizing, laying out and proofing publications. The financial terms of the acquisition were not disclosed.

In January 2014, Issuu released its Android app. In July 2014, the company released Clip, a tool that allowed readers to take a snapshot of any part of a publication and share that on social media or through email. In October 2014 Issuu released its iOS app to access Issuu on Apple devices. By 2014 the platform hosted more than 18 million publications and had 83 million users.

In 2019, Issuu announced the launch of Issuu Promote, an ad integration tool for Facebook and Instagram, allowing for content to be distributed across multiple social media channels.

The company announced that its iOS and Android apps would be discontinued in April 2023.

In July 2024, the Italian technology company Bending Spoons announced it had acquired Issuu.

=== Funding ===
The company obtained $10 million in Series B that closed in 2014. In September 2021, Issuu closed a round of financing that raised $31 million.

== Products and services ==
Issuu develops apps that convert PDFs into digital publications that can be shared via links or embedded into websites. Users can edit their publications by customizing the design, using templates, or adding links and multimedia to the pages of their documents. Issuu also provides tools for measuring and monetization of content.

The app includes an offline reading list function that allowed users to read from the Issuu app without being online. The app can also stack publications back to back so that they can be read in succession.

== See also ==
- Docstoc
