= Banca Popolare di Spoleto =

Italian bank

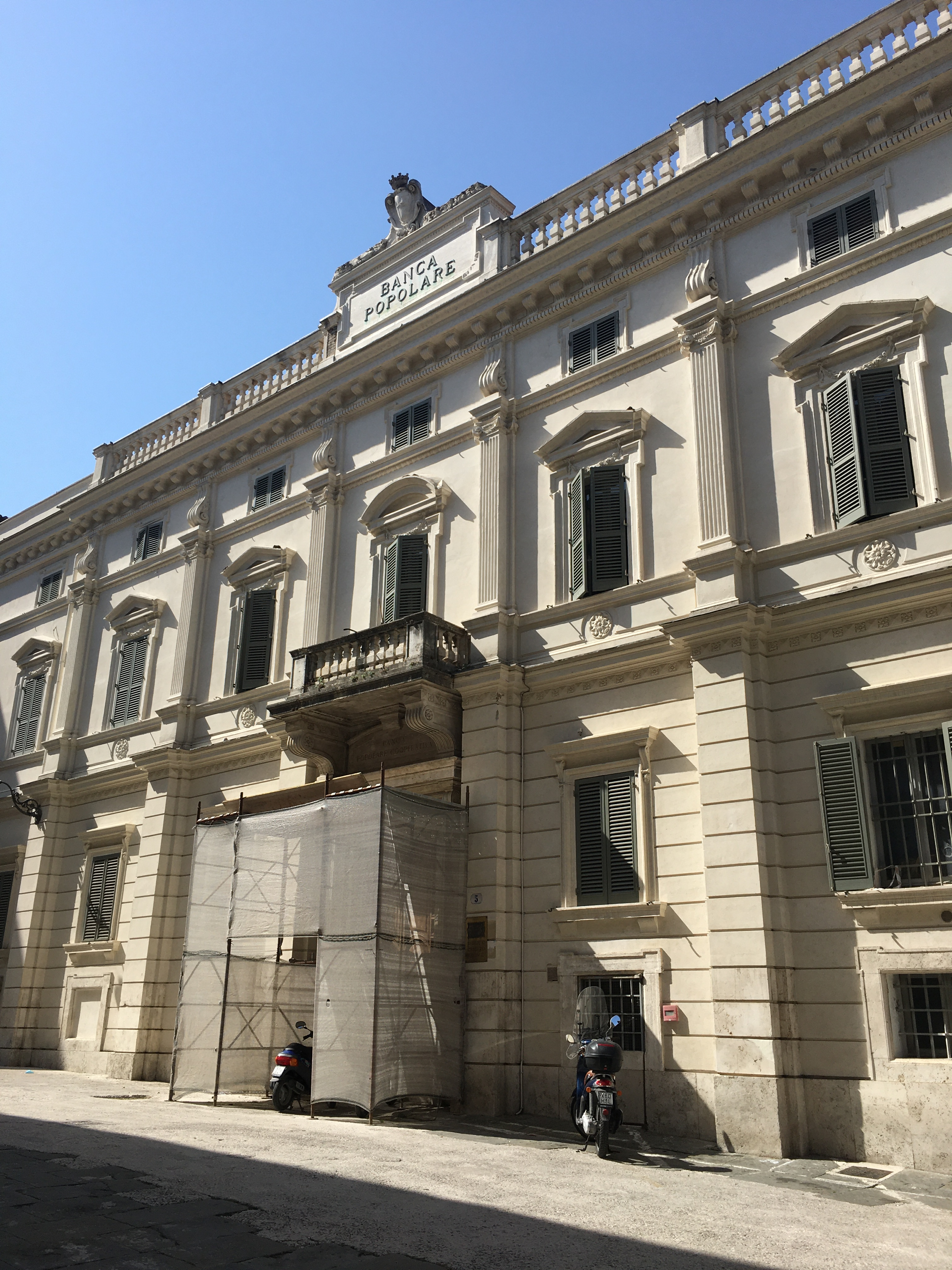
- Native name: Banca Popolare di Spoleto S.p.A.
- Formerly: Banca Cooperativa Popolare in Spoleto
- Company type: Subsidiary; Public (former)
- Traded as: BIT: SPO (former)
- ISIN: IT0001007209
- Industry: Financial services
- Founded: 28 April 1895; 30 July 1992 (S.p.A.)
- Founder: Giulio Cesari
- Headquarters: Piazza Luigi Pianciani, Spoleto, Italy
- Net income: (€35,014,744) (Jul.–Dec.2014)
- Total assets: ▼€3,282,541,271 (end 2014)
- Total equity: ▼€173,175,791 (end 2014)
- Owner: Banco di Desio e della Brianza (73.16%); Spoleto Credito e Servizi (13.22%); Banca Monte dei Paschi di Siena (7.23%)
- Parent: Banco di Desio e della Brianza
- Capital ratio: 7.99% (CET1)
- Website: Official website

Banca Popolare di Spoleto S.p.A. is an Italian bank based in Spoleto, Umbria region. It was a subsidiary of Banco di Desio e della Brianza.

== History ==
Banca Cooperativa Popolare in Spoleto Soc. Coop. was found on 28 April 1895 by Professor Giulio Cesari, as well as other funder.

In 1992 the cooperative society spin off their bank activity to form a "company limited by shares" (società per azioni): Banca Popolare di Spoleto S.p.A.; the controlling interests was acquired by Credito Italiano (50.71% in 1998), and the original cooperative society was renamed to "Popolare Spoleto - Credito e Servizi".

The Sp.A. was listed in the Borsa Italiana in 1996. Credito Italiano sold the bank in mid-1998. As at 31 December 1998 Spoleto Credito e Servizi was the major shareholders of 53.110%, followed by Banca Monte dei Paschi di Siena (Banca MPS) (and its subsidiary Monte Paschi Vita) for 25.956%. In 2005, due to capital increases, Banca MPS Group hold 25.981% shares of BP Spoleto S.p.A..

As at 31 December 2012, the bank had a Tier 1 capital ratio of 6.45%. From February 2013 to 31 July 2014 it was under extraordinary administration by the Ministry of Economy and Finance. On 1 April 2014 Banco di Desio e della Brianza subscribed the capital increases of the bank for €140 million, making former largest shareholder, Spoleto Credito e Servizi Soc. Coop. (ex-Banca Popolare di Spoleto Soc. Coop.), became the second largest. On 31 July 2014 the Tier 1 capital ratio was increased to 9.371%, but decreased to 7.99% as at 31 December 2014.

In 2017, due to less than 10% shares being owned by the public, the bank ceased to be a listed company.

== See also ==
- List of banks in Italy
