= Pricesearcher =

E-commerce search engine

- Founded: 2011
- Dissolved: March 12, 2020
- Headquarters: United Kingdom
- Owner: Priceseacher Technology Group Ltd
- Founder: Samuel Dean Hussain
- Industry: Internet
- Website: pricesearcher.com
- Launched: 2016; 10 years ago
- Current status: Defunct

Pricesearcher was an independent e-commerce search engine launched in the UK in 2016. It had one of the UK's largest product data sets with more than 1.1 billion products from over 2,500 retailers.

It did not use the traditional price comparison website (PCW) model adopted by comparison sites such as moneysupermarket.com and search engines such as Google Shopping where retailers paid to list their products for sale. Instead it listed products from online retailers without charging a listing fee or commission for sales.

It planned to launch an intent-based pay per click model to retailers. Shoppers could use the vertical search engine as a price-checking tool, to see whether there were cheaper prices elsewhere. The company that developed the site went into administration in 2020 and the website was closed.

== History ==
Pricesearcher began as a small, self-funded project by Samuel Dean in 2011, with the aim of indexing all products available to buy online to give shoppers a clear picture.

Samuel Dean used Peopleperhour in the early days to find freelancers to work on the initial project. Then in 2014, he recruited Raja Akhtar, a PHP specialist, and the two worked together in their spare time. Akhtar was Head of Web Development at Pricesearcher. In 2015, they recruited a freelance DevOps engineer, Vlassios Rizopoulos, to help speed up the product indexing process. In 2017, Rizopoulos became Pricesearcher's Chief Technology Officer.

Their goal was to list a searched-for item in one view, from retailers, marketplaces, classified advertising sites, brands and shopping comparison sites. As the product index increased, funding was sought. In 2016, Pricesearcher was launched and received its first outside seed funding from private investors.

Retailers who joined the Pricesearcher search engine in their first year were Amazon, Argos, IKEA, Mothercare, Currys, PC World, Dreams (bed retailer), Wilko, King of Shaves, JD Sports. More joined since.

In September 2018, Pricesearcher was selected to join the London Stock Exchange's capital-raising programme.

In October 2018, former Amazon UK Head of Pricing Weldon W. Whitener joined Pricesearcher as Chief Analytics officer.

In January 2019, Pricesearcher became a Google CSS Partner (Comparison Shopping Services).

In March 2019, Pi Datametrics and Pricesearcher launched a joint product for digital retailers, "The first ever combining of organic search data and online product price data in a single report, PricePoint allows retailers to highlight where the winning pricing opportunities exist online, alongside organic visibility."

In July 2019, Pricesearcher partnered with Latestdeals.co.uk, a UK discount code platform, where its technology powered price comparison for its 3 million consumers.

On 12 March 2020 Pricesearcher Ltd went into administration.

On 20 March, Founder Samuel Dean and Jack Sundt formed a new business, Pricesearcher Technology Group Ltd.

== Technology ==
Pricesearcher used PriceBot, its custom web crawler, to search the web for prices, and it allowed direct product feeds from retailers at no cost. The search engine's rapid growth was attributed to its enabling technology: a retailer could upload its product feed in any format, without the need for further development. Pricesearcher processed 1.5 billion prices every day and used Amazon Web Services (AWS), to which it migrated in December 2016, to enable the high volume of data processing required. The rest of the business used algorithms, NLP, Machine learning, data science and artificial intelligence to organise all the data.

As of February 2018, Pricesearcher processed 2,500 UK retailers through PriceBot. A further 4,000 retailers were using product feeds to submit product information to the search engine.

== Web crawler ==
Like Google's web crawler, GoogleBot, PriceBot identified online retailers and crawled their websites looking for products that were sold. Retailers could submit their own websites for crawling by PriceBot.

== Business model ==
Pricesearcher was free to use for both shoppers and retailers. It operated like Google and indeed.com as a free-to-list search engine. It planned to launch an intent-based pay per click model for advertisers. This was different than other price comparison sites which used an affiliate advertising model.

== Research ==
Data collected by Pricesearcher was presented at the Brighton SEO Conference in a presentation: "What we have learnt from indexing over half a billion products". Using the first 500 million products, Pricesearcher found that the average length of a product title was 48 characters (including spaces). Product descriptions averaged 522 characters, or 90 words. 44.9% included shipping costs. 40.2% did not provide dimensions such as size and colour. Their research showed that many retailers could improve their product listings by using brand terms as product keywords, using GTINs and putting product attributes in separate fields.

Between December 2016 and September 2017, Pricesearcher recorded 4 billion price changes globally. The country with the most price changes was the UK – one every six days.
