= Switchwise =

Australian price comparison service

Switchwise Pty Ltd
- Type: Private
- Industry: Price comparison service
- Founded: 2007
- Defunct: 3 June 2019
- Headquarters: Melbourne, Australia
- Website: switchwise.com.au

Switchwise.com.au was an electricity and gas price comparison service website for Australian consumers. The site enabled consumers to compare electricity and gas prices offered by 25 Australian energy suppliers. Consumers could switch their home energy supplier to a cheaper provider by completing an online application. People moving their homes could also arrange for cheaper electricity and gas connections through the site.

Access to the site was free to consumers. The company earned revenue by charging a commission to the supplier to which a customer chooses to switch or connect via the Switchwise website. The company also earned revenue from advertising across the site.

As of June 2019, the company's website indicated it was no longer operational. No reason was given.

== History ==
Switchwise.com.au was established by Shaun Johnson in 2007 and the site was launched to the public in September 2008. The company was funded by Netus, an Australian technology investment group, which in turn was majority owned by News Limited. Switchwise also partnered with Serviceworks Management, a provider of services to the energy industry.

== See also ==
- National Electricity Market
