= FuelWatch =

Western Australian Government agency

- Type: Government agency
- Industry: Government
- Founded: 2001
- Headquarters: Perth
- Area served: Western Australia
- Products: Information

FuelWatch is a fuel monitoring service created by the Government of Western Australia. It was established by the Government of Western Australia in January 2001. On 2 January 2001 FuelWatch commenced daily monitoring of prices for petrol, diesel and LPG within metropolitan Perth and many regional areas in the South West of the state. The service covers most areas of Western Australia and is operated by the Department of Energy, Mines, Industry Regulation and Safety. The service has led to a decrease in fuel prices. In 2008, plans to implement a national system of the same kind failed to pass a Senate vote.
