= Compare Group =

Dutch price comparison company

Vergelijk.nl
- Company type: Privately held
- Website type: Price comparison service
- Available in: French, Dutch, Finnish, Flemish, German, Swedish, French, Danish, Norwegian
- Founded: 1999
- Headquarters: Zwolle, Netherlands, Helsinki, Finland
- Founders: Ben Kerkhof, Jean-Paul Southout, Tjibbe de Jong
- Key people: Joris Verwater (CEO), Maarten Janssen (CTO)
- Industry: Internet
- Employees: 40
- Website: www.vergelijk.nl
- Launched: 1999
- Written in: Java

Vergelijk.nl (Compare Group) is a privately held company which holds six price comparison services in four countries and was founded in the Netherlands in 1999.

== History ==
Vergelijk.nl was founded in 1999 by Ben Kerkhof, Jean Paul Soethout and Tjibbe de Jong and was the first price comparison website in the Netherlands. In 2000, Vergelijk.nl co-founder Ben Kerkhof started Vertaa.fi, a price comparison website based in Finland. Business was expanded to Belgium in 2002 with the start of Vergelijk.be and in 2006 Vergelijk.nl acquired Dutch competitor ElCheapo.nl. In September 2021 Compare Group launched a new CSS in Germany named ElCheapo.de (rebranded to Bestekauf.de in August 2022). Eleven months after the launch of Bestekauf.de Compare Group entered the Swedish market with its new CSS Varusök.se continuing its European expansion. In May 2025 Compare Group relaunched its French comparison site Comparer.fr following by its Danish and Norwegian CSS's in September 2025.

Early 2015 Vergelijk.nl launched their omni-channel localised price comparison service in which not just products and offers from webshops are compared but also those of the traditional brick and mortar merchants.

=== Currently operational CSS websites ===
- vergelijk.nl
- vergelijk.be
- comparer.be
- vertaa.fi
- bestekauf.de
- varusök.se
- comparer.fr
- sammenlign.dk
- sammenlign.no

Compare Group was founded shortly after the acquisition of Elcheapo.nl in 2006, in order to centralize the management of the different labels. Since the founding of the Compare Group, business was expanded further to France and French-speaking Belgium with the foundation of Comparer.fr and Comparer.be in 2009.

Although Compare Group provides some insights in monthly visitor amounts, it does not publish exact visitor numbers. It is known that in 2004 Vergelijk.nl welcomed its 20 millionth visitor since its founding in 1999 and passed the 40 million visitors mark in 2006.

In september 2017 Vergelijk.nl and Vergelijk.be were the first CSSs in Europe allowed to participate in Google Shopping PLA's after Google was fined with a 2.4 billion euro antitrust fine.

In March 2018 Vergelijk.nl and Vergelijk.be were the first CSSs in The Netherlands and Belgium to show Amazon results on its websites.

=== Discontinued projects ===
- Comparestreet.co.uk, a price comparison website based in the United Kingdom. The website was founded in 2002 and discontinued in 2006.
- Adultcompare.nl, a website aimed at comparing prices of erotic and adult products which was founded in 2002. It was discontinued as a separate project in 2004 when it was integrated in Vergelijk.nl.
- Superdagdeal.nl, a website founded in 2010. Superdagdeal.nl focused on offering one special deal which lasted for 24 hours. The website was sold in 2011 to GoldenExperience.
- Check Magazine, a print magazine by BesteProduct.nl, Vergelijk.nl, Independer.nl and Zoover, was introduced in 2008 and wrote mainly about trends and developments in online shopping. Check Magazine was discontinued after three issues due to a lack of subscribers and advertisement revenue.
- July 2014: The Vergelijk.nl shopping cart: Vergelijk.nl’s take on a marketplace was discontinued because of lack of interest and usage by both the merchants and its visitors;
- January 2015: Early 2015 Vergelijk.nl decided to strengthen the brand name of Vergelijk.nl in the Dutch market. Its brand ElCheapo.nl was conflicting with this so the decision was taken to discontinue this website;
- May 2017: Discontinued Comparer.fr - relaunched in May 2025
- August 2022: ElCheapo.de was rebranded to Bestekauf.de

=== Acquisitions ===
- 2003: Arbalet - Belgian comparison competitor Arbalet was acquired in 2003. Its activities were incorporated and continued in Vergelijk.be. Arbalet ceased to exist as a separate entity.
- 2004: Consumerdesk.nl - Consumerdesk.nl was acquired along with other assets from the bankrupt company Cedron.
- 2006: Elcheapo.nl - Competing price comparison website Elcheapo.nl was acquired from De Telegraaf in 2006. No details on the acquisition have been disclosed.

== Business model ==
Vergelijk.nl’s business model consists of three main revenue drivers:

- Lead generation for web shops using a cost per click model often backed-up with a ROAS guarantee.
- A monthly subscription fee for the traditional brick & mortar merchants.
- A cost per sale model which provides Vergelijk.nl a percentage of the order value for every order placed on Vergelijk.nl's websites. Although Vergelijk.nl receives the orders, the actual processing of orders is done by web shops. Web shops receive the order value subtracted by Vergelijk.nl’s compensation.
- In 2014 Vergelijk.nl decided to terminate their marketplace /cost per sale model.

== Revenue ==
No figures on profits or losses have been published by Compare Group.

== Awards ==
- 2011: Comparer.fr was elected in the top 10 favorite French comparison sites.
- 2012: Vergelijk.nl won the High Growth Award of its region.
- 2013: Vergelijk.nl was nominated for the Best Comparison Website Award at the Dutch Thuiswinkel Awards.

Compare Group's comparison websites:

- Vergelijk.nl
- Vergelijk.be
- Comparer.be
- Vertaa.fi
- Bestekauf.de
- Varusök.se
- Comparer.fr
- Sammenlign.dk
- Sammenlign.no
