= Connexity Inc. =

Privately held operator of shopping web sites

- Company type: Private
- Industry: Internet Services : Comparison Shopping
- Founded: November 1996; 29 years ago, in Los Angeles, California
- Founder: Farhad Mohit; Henri Asseily
- Headquarters: Los Angeles, California, U.S.
- Key people: Bill Glass (CEO)
- Parent: Taboola
- Divisions: www.shopzilla.com
- Website: connexity.com

Connexity Inc. is a privately held Los Angeles operator of shopping web sites, including Shopzilla.com. Originally started as comparison shopping website Bizrate.com, the company changed its name to Shopzilla in 2004, and changed again to Connexity in 2014.

Connexity operates websites serving consumers and retailers in the U.S., UK, French and German markets. The company is headquartered in West Los Angeles, CA.

== History ==
Originally founded as Bizrate.com, the company changed its name to Shopzilla in 2004.

In June 2005, Shopzilla was acquired by The E. W. Scripps Company for $525 million and was part of its interactive media division.

In June 2011, Scripps sold Shopzilla to strategic private equity Symphony Technology Group for $165M. In September 2014, Shopzilla rebranded as Connexity. In December, Connexity bought fellow price comparison shopping company Become.com.

In June 2015, it announced it had purchased PriceGrabber, Inc. for an undisclosed amount. In 2016, Connexity sold its division, Bizrate Insights, to Time Inc. In September 2021, Connexity was acquired by Taboola.
