= Submarine Telecoms Forum =

- Frequency: Bi-monthly
- Circulation: 100,000+ every 2 months
- Publisher: Wayne Nielsen
- Founded: 2001
- First issue: November 2001
- Country: USA
- Based in: Sterling, Virginia
- Language: English
- Website: http://www.subtelforum.com
- ISSN: 1948-3031

Submarine Telecoms Forum is a bi-monthly trade magazine dedicated to the submarine cable industry. It is released in January, March, May, July, September and November, and each issue covers a particular theme related to the industry. Themes include: Global Outlook, Finance & Legal, Global Capacity, Regional Systems, Offshore Energy, Data Centers & New Technology. Submarine Telecoms Forum, sometimes abbreviated to SubTel Forum, is an online magazine released via the Issuu digital platform.

== History ==
Submarine Telecoms Forum was established in November 2001.

As a former employee of British Telecom and Cable & Wireless, Submarine Telecoms Forum co-founder, Wayne Nielsen, had been involved in the international submarine telecoms industry since 1985. He established WFN Strategies in 2001 and was assisting system developers and integrators, installers, etc.

Submarine Telecoms Forum co-founder, Ted Breeze, had been active in the submarine Telecom industry since 1987 and was responsible for the corporate marketing presence for British Telecom Marine and Cable & Wireless Marine before establishing his consultancy, BJ Marketing Communications, in 1996.

In previous lives, both Nielsen and Breeze were the originating publishers of BT Marine’s 1991 onwards publication, Soundings. In 1998, they published SAIC’s magazine, Real Time, the industry's first electronic magazine with a mailing list was some 2500 submarine telecom contacts worldwide, plus linked via the web to others.

In 2001, the submarine telecom industry represented more than a $5B per annum in sales and yet no magazine existed which properly serviced its many issues. Under the banner of WFN Strategies, Nielsen and Breeze established the first industry-wide electronic and freely available magazine, Submarine Telecoms Forum, which was funded solely through advertising revenues.

The first issue of Submarine Telecoms Forum magazine was published in November 2001. In 2008, an industry RSS feed was added to the website.

In 2004 and 2005 Submarine Telecoms Forum produced a submarine cable map for purchase. In 2008 an updated submarine cable map, which is funded through sponsorships, was forwarded freely to 3000 international industry contacts.

From 2004 through 2019, Submarine Telecoms Forum produced an industry calendar which was funded through monthly sponsorships and forwarded freely to 3000 international industry contacts.

In May 2008, Submarine Telecoms Forum was selected by the submarine telecommunications industry association, SubOptic, to act as Media Partner in support of its upcoming conference in Yokohama in 2010. In 2013, Submarine Telecoms Forum again acted as media partner in support of the SubOptic 2013 conference in Paris, France. In addition, Submarine Telecoms Forum reported live from the conference through a series of blogs and videos and has continued in this role since then.

In July 2019 Submarine Telecoms Forum, Inc. was approved as an IACET Accredited Provider. Using this accreditation, Subtel Forum has partnered with PTC Academy to provide online training beginning September 2020.

== Circulation ==
Submarine Telecoms Forum Magazine is free to its readers representing 110 countries. Submarine Telecoms Forum magazine averages 100,000 downloads per issue. The Submarine Cable Almanac averages 250,000 hits per issue.

== Notable contributors ==
Notable contributors include:

- Houlin Zhao, Secretary General of International Telecommunication Union
- PamelaGidi Masías, Vice-Minister of Telecommunications - Chile
- Walter Roban, Deputy Premier and Minister of Home Affairs - Bermuda
- Amber Case, Author & Futurist

== Magazine Issue themes ==
Each issue of Submarine Telecoms Forum is built around a central theme, discussing that specific aspect of the submarine fiber market.

- January: Global Outlook
- March: Finance & Legal
- May: Global Capacity
- July: Regional Systems
- September: Offshore Energy
- November: Data Centers & New Technology
