= Romero Rodrigues =

Brazilian businessman (born 1977)

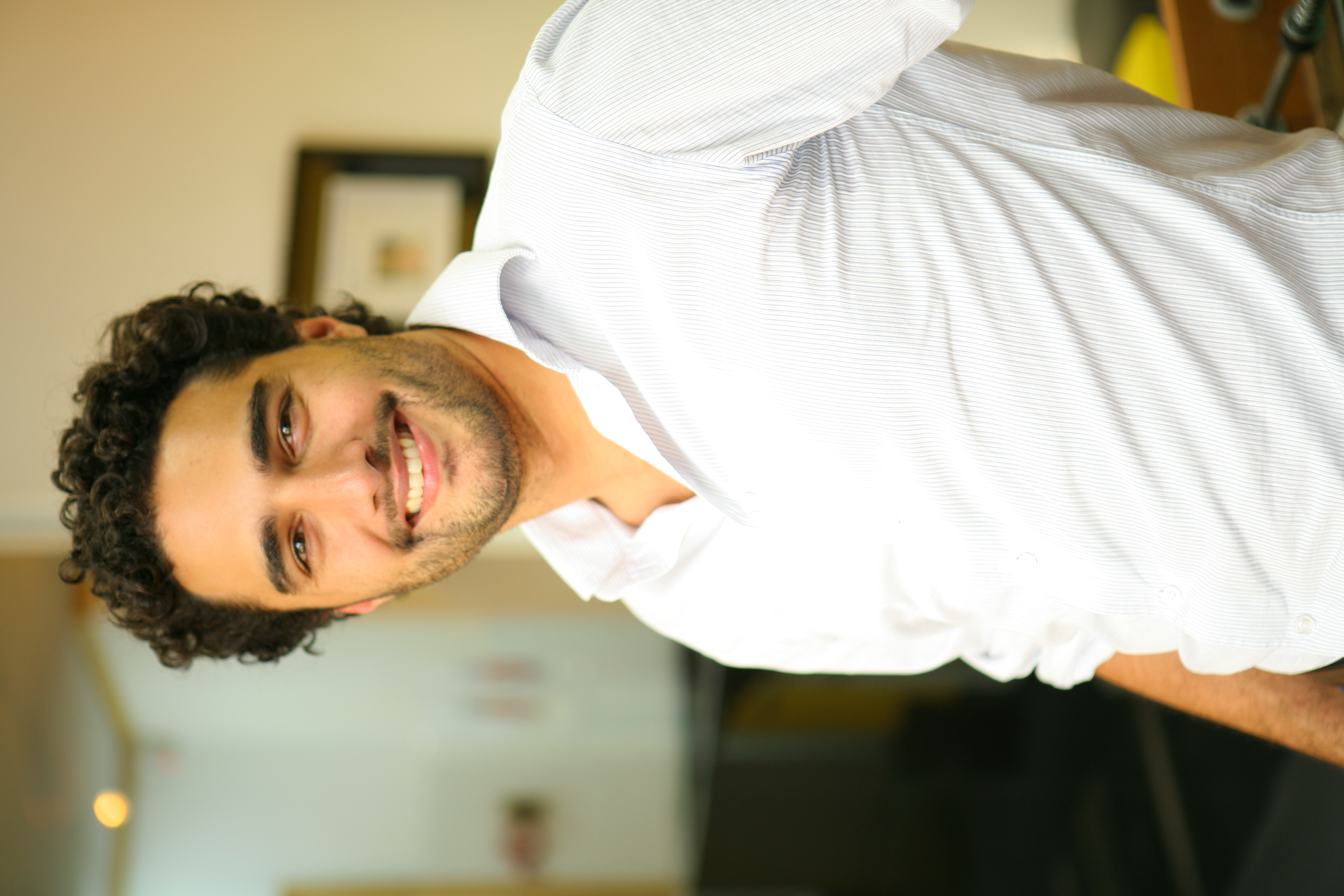
- Rodrigues in Buscapé headquarters in São Paulo, 2010
- Born: Romero Venâncio Rodrigues Filho; October 1, 1977 (age 48); São Paulo, Brazil
- Education: Polytechnic School of the University of São Paulo
- Occupation: Businessman

Romero Venâncio Rodrigues Filho (born October 1, 1977) is a Brazilian businessman who studied Electrical Engineering at the Polytechnic School of the University of São Paulo. He was a founder and president of Buscapé, a group that also included the companies Bondfaro, Confiômetro, CortaContas, e-Behavior, e-bit, Lomadee, Pagamento Digital, FControl, Pista Certa, QueBarato! and SaveMe. At the age of 21, Romero created Buscapé with three partners also from the University: Ronaldo Takahashi, Rodrigo Borges and Mário Letelier.

In 2009, Buscapé was sold to the South African company Naspers for US$342 million.

== Career ==
Rodrigues entered the Polytechnic School of the University of São Paulo (Poli USP) in 1995, when he was 18 years old. After his primary and secondary studies at the Colégio Visconde de Porto Seguro, in Morumbi, São Paulo, he joined the Electrical Engineering course. Between 1996 and 2000, Romero was a research intern, as part of professional practice at the “Laboratório de Arquitetura e Redes de Computadores” (LARC) of the Poli USP, taking part in projects such as the development of Internet 2 in Brazil (RMAV), Data Base, Security and Monitoring of links. In 1998, Romero and three friends from the University, Ronaldo Takahashi, Rodrigo Borges and Mário Letelier, founded Buscapé.

== Leadership of Buscapé ==
The first idea of what became Buscapé emerged when Rodrigo Borges was looking for a printer model on the Internet. He could not find information on the price or technical specifications of the product online. Therefore, the four friends concluded that it was an opportunity to be explored and decided to create a business that could provide a solution for that need. With investments of R$100 from each monthly to pay for hosting, system development and layout, the four founded Buscapé in the "garage company" style in 1998. Romero assumed leadership of the project from the beginning, acting as president of Buscapé. The businessman also led the process of internationalization and expansion of Buscapé, and its sale of the company to Naspers in 2009.
