= Gasoline price website =

Price comparison website

A gasoline price website is a type of price comparison website that provides current fuel price information for different filling stations. Supported fuel types generally include gasoline, but may also include diesel, liquefied petroleum gas, biofuels and recharge electricity.

The main utility of these websites is that they allow users to find the lowest price of gasoline in their area, since gasoline prices often vary significantly between gas stations in the same neighborhood. In addition to listing prices for particular filling stations, some of sites also show the average cost of gasoline in the area and price trends.

== Commercial services ==
Many commercial websites allow registered users or site visitors to update the price information, usually for an incentive such as "points" which are accumulated and displayed alongside a user's name. In some cases, points can be redeemed for rewards, such as an entry in a drawing for a prize, such as electric vehicles and free fuel cards. Some sites also provide message forums to allow users to engage in discussions about gas prices and money-saving strategies, among other topics. Fuel prices are sometimes made available via SMS text messaging.

One site, Gasbuddy.com, has different web addresses for different cities in the United States and Canada. The site offers one gasoline gift card every day to contributors.

== Government-sponsored services ==
In Western Australia, the FuelWatch concept is a free service, backed by Government legislation. The system was considered for implementation nationwide, but was met with some controversy. The FuelWatch concept requires all fuel retailers in Perth, and approximately 80% of those within the state but outside of the state capital area, to notify their "tomorrow prices" by 2pm each day. Prices are changed at 6am each morning, and must be held for 24 hours. Each afternoon, the prices for the next day are released to the public and the media, allowing consumers to make an informed decision whether to fill up today or tomorrow, safe in the knowledge that prices cannot change. In the United Kingdom Fuel Finder UK – UK fuel price comparison site aggregating data from the CMA Fuel Finder open data scheme under the Motor Fuel Price (Open Data) Regulations 2025 from the UK Government.

== See also ==
- Gasoline usage and pricing
- Petroleum
- Zone pricing
- FuelWatch
- GasBuddy.com
- Comparison shopping website
