= Streetprices =

StreetPrices.com, Inc
- Company type: C Corporation
- Industry: Internet Services : Comparison Shopping
- Founded: 1997
- Headquarters: 2700 Augustine Dr, Suite 155, Santa Clara, California, U.S.
- Website: Official Website

StreetPrices was founded in October 1997, making it the third price comparison service website, behind PriceWatch (1995) and ComputerESP/uVision (1996). StreetPrices was the first site to offer price graphs and price alerts (both released by December 1998), and was listed in the Consumer Reports Buying Guide every year in which they listed price comparison services by name. They focused primarily on digital cameras, consumer electronics, and computer components like disk drives and RAM, with some coverage of other shopping categories.

StreetPrices offered comparison shopping with merchant ratings and tax/shipping calculation. Major categories like digital cameras and TVs let users "search by specs". StreetPrices also offered price graphs, now showing the daily high and low price for each item, with data going back as far as two years.

Also available were an AIM bot (streetpricesbot), and price comparison widgets that publishers could put on their web pages.

Closed as of 2012
