= FTSE Italia Mid Cap =

Italian stock market index

The FTSE Italia Mid Cap is a stock market index of Borsa Italiana, the main stock exchange of Italy. Calculated by FTSE Russell as part of the FTSE Italia Index Series, it comprises the 60 largest companies listed on the Euronext Milan and Euronext MIV Milan markets that are not constituents of the FTSE MIB. Together with the FTSE MIB and the FTSE Italia Small Cap, it forms the FTSE Italia All-Share index.

== Methodology ==
Eligible shares must pass the free float and liquidity screens of the FTSE Italia Index Series: companies with a free float of 5% or less are excluded, as are shares that do not reach a minimum trading volume over the twelve months before a review. Excluding the constituents of the FTSE MIB, eligible shares are ranked by full market capitalisation and the top 60 are selected; secondary lines are not eligible.

The index is reviewed quarterly, in March, June, September and December, using market data as at the close of business on the Monday four weeks before the effective date; changes take effect after the close of business on the third Friday of the review month. A buffer limits movements between the Mid Cap and Small Cap indices: a non-constituent is added if it ranks 55th or higher, while a constituent is removed if it falls to 66th or below. At each review FTSE Russell publishes a reserve list of ten companies, used to replace constituents deleted between reviews. Constituents are weighted by free-float market capitalisation, and individual weights are capped at 10% at each quarterly review.

== Constituents ==
The following 60 companies were constituents of the index as of 27 October 2026, according to the list published by Borsa Italiana; the ticker and ISIN link to each company's page on the Borsa Italiana website, which also gives the ICB supersector. The latest quarterly review took effect on 21 September 2026.

Company	Ticker	ISIN	ICB supersector
Acea	ACE	IT0001207098	Utilities
Alerion	ARN	IT0004720733	Utilities
Anima Holding	ANIM	IT0004998065	Financial Services
Ascopiave	ASC	IT0004093263	Utilities
B.F.	BFG	IT0005187460	Food, Beverage and Tobacco
Banca Generali	BGN	IT0001031084	Banks
Banca Ifis	IF	IT0003188064	Financial Services
Banco Desio	BDB	IT0001041000	Banks
BFF Bank	BFF	IT0005244402	Financial Services
Brembo	BRE	NL0015001KT6	Automobiles and Parts
Caltagirone	CALT	IT0003127930	Construction and Materials
Carel Industries	CRL	IT0005331019	Construction and Materials
Cembre	CMB	IT0001128047	Industrial Goods and Services
Cementir Holding	CEM	NL0013995087	Construction and Materials
CIR	CIR	IT0000070786	Automobiles and Parts
Comer Industries	COM	IT0005246191	Industrial Goods and Services
Credem	CE	IT0003121677	Banks
D'Amico International Shipping	DIS	LU2592315662	Industrial Goods and Services
Danieli & C.	DAN	IT0000076502	Industrial Goods and Services
De'Longhi	DLG	IT0003115950	Consumer Products and Services
DiaSorin	DIA	IT0003492391	Health Care
El.En.	ELN	IT0005453250	Health Care
ENAV	ENAV	IT0005176406	Industrial Goods and Services
ERG	ERG	IT0001157020	Utilities
Ferretti	YACHT	IT0005383291	Consumer Products and Services
Fiera Milano	FM	IT0003365613	Industrial Goods and Services
Garofalo Health Care	GHC	IT0005345233	Health Care
Gens Aurea	OROX	IT0005713232	Retail
GVS	GVS	IT0005411209	Health Care
Intercos	ICOS	IT0005455875	Consumer Products and Services
Interpump Group	IP	IT0001078911	Industrial Goods and Services
Iren	IRE	IT0003027817	Utilities
Italmobiliare	ITM	IT0005253205	Financial Services
Juventus	JUVE	IT0005572778	Travel and Leisure
LU-VE	LUVE	IT0005107492	Construction and Materials
Maire	MAIRE	IT0004931058	Construction and Materials
MFE (A shares)	MFEA	NL0015001OI1	Media
MFE (B shares)	MFEB	NL0015001OJ9	Media
Moltiply Group	MOL	IT0004195308	Financial Services
Mondadori	MN	IT0001469383	Media
NewPrinces	NWL	IT0005385213	Food, Beverage and Tobacco
OVS	OVS	IT0005043507	Consumer Products and Services
PharmaNutra	PHN	IT0005274094	Health Care
Philogen	PHIL	IT0005373789	Health Care
Piaggio	PIA	IT0003073266	Consumer Products and Services
Pirelli & C.	PIRC	IT0005278236	Automobiles and Parts
Rai Way	RWAY	IT0005054967	Telecommunications
Reply	REY	IT0005282865	Technology
REVO Insurance	REVO	IT0005513202	Insurance
Safilo Group	SFL	IT0004604762	Consumer Products and Services
Salvatore Ferragamo	SFER	IT0004712375	Consumer Products and Services
Sanlorenzo	SL	IT0003549422	Consumer Products and Services
Sesa	SES	IT0004729759	Technology
SOL	SOL	IT0001206769	Chemicals
Tamburi Investment Partners	TIP	IT0003153621	Financial Services
Technogym	TGYM	IT0005162406	Consumer Products and Services
TXT e-solutions	TXT	IT0001454435	Technology
Webuild	WBD	IT0003865570	Construction and Materials
WIIT	WIIT	IT0005440893	Technology
Zignago Vetro	ZV	IT0004171440	Industrial Goods and Services

== See also ==
- FTSE MIB
- List of stock market indices
