= PriceRunner =

Price comparison service website

- Founded: 1999; 27 years ago
- Founder: Kristofer Arwin, Magnus Wiberg and Martin Alexanderson
- Key people: Mikael Lindahl
- Products: Price comparison service
- Owner: Klarna
- Number of employees: 175
- Website: www.pricerunner.com

The website PriceRunner is a price comparison service launched in Sweden in 1999. It allows users to compare prices on a range of products. The company is headquartered in Stockholm, Sweden, and also operates within Denmark, and the UK. In March 2022, it was announced that PriceRunner had been acquired by the Swedish fintech company, Klarna.

== History ==
PriceRunner was launched in 1999 as a price comparison service based in Sweden and originally financed by a venture capitalist group called Cell Ventures, who were later acquired by NewMedia Spark. It launched the service in the UK and Denmark in 2000. Initially, they had planned to become a pan-European service, but some of these services were closed down in 2002 after poor financial performance.

In August 2004, it was acquired by ValueClick, an online media company, for £16 million ($29 million) after NewMedia Spark sold its share in the company.

Further expansion saw PriceRunner reopen the French office in August 2004, go into Germany in October of the same year, and the United States in October 2005. It also launched awards for retailers of the year based on its customer reviews.

In 2006, it announced that it would launch a partnership service with 118 118, a UK phone based service, to provide prices to people by SMS. This followed an earlier failure to enter the mobile market in 2002 by providing price tracking through the site. In October, MSN announced that their Shopping sites in France and the UK would be powered by PriceRunner and Shopping.com. They had previously been powered by Kelkoo.

In 2007-8 PriceRunner also set up partnerships with Ask, the Energy Saving Trust, MSN and Which? providing them with shopping engines for their websites. It also partnered with Nectar to offer Nectar Points. In 2011, it introduced new branding produced by agency Firedog.

In November 2013, ValueClick sold its global media properties (including Investopedia, Coupon Mountain and PriceRunner) to IAC for a reported $80 million.

In March 2016, PriceRunner was sold to Swedish firm NS Intressenter. Barry Diller of IAC had initially been looking for "roughly $100 million", although the actual sale figure was not disclosed publicly.

As of 2020, Nicklas Storåkers, CEO, and the investment firm eEquity have purchased Nordstjernans ownership stake in the company, with one of PriceRunner's founders, Magnus Wiberg returning as an executive board member.

In March 2022 the Swedish financial supervisory authority Finansinspektionen approved the deal with Klarna. PriceRunner officially became part of Klarna as of April 1, 2022.

== Technology ==
PriceRunner uses a combination of screen scraping retailers' websites and files supplied by the retailers themselves. These prices are matched against a backend database. This is done both by using a fuzzy logic automatching system and manually by admin staff.

== Business model ==
PriceRunner is similar to other price comparison services in that it is financed by advertisers, who pay on a pay per click model. It also uses web banners provided by sister company, advertising network ValueClick Media.
