= Kelkoo Group =

European price comparison service

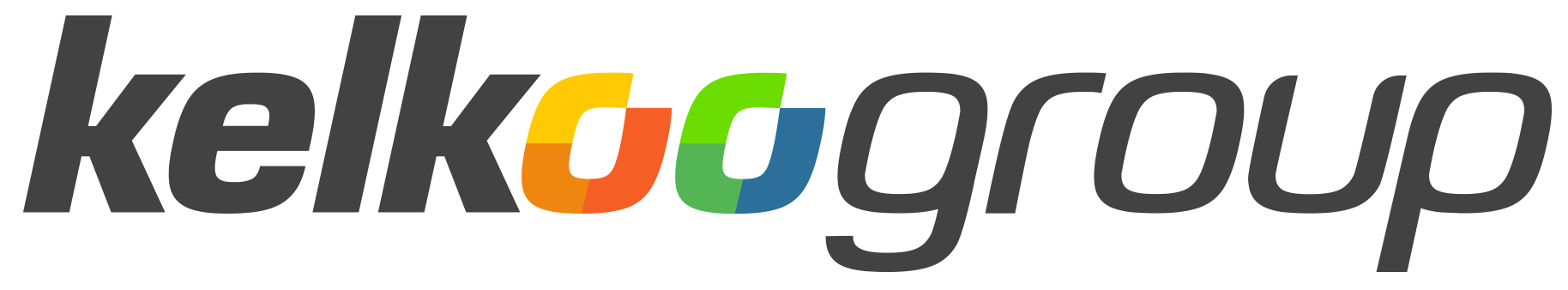
- Website type: E-commerce
- Founded: 1999
- Owner: Jamplant Ltd
- Founders: Pierre Chappaz, Jérôme Mercier, Mauricio Lopez
- Key people: Richard Stables, CEO 2009-
- Industry: Internet
- Services: Price comparison service, Online advertising
- Subsidiaries: http://www.kelkoo.com http://www.leguide.com
- Website: http://www.kelkoogroup.com
- Launched: November 30, 1999; 26 years ago

Kelkoo is a European price comparison service founded in France in 1999.

In 2000 Kelkoo merged with Zoomit, Dondecomprar and Shopgenie. The company was bought by Yahoo! on 26 March 2004. and was subsequently sold by Yahoo to Jamplant, a British private equity firm, in 2008. On 13 October 2016 Kelkoo, the ecommerce advertising and price comparison platform, announced the acquisition of LeGuide group, updating its branding to reflect the acquisition: Kelkoo Group.

Kelkoo Group operates in 22 countries (Austria, Belgium, Brazil, Czech Republic, Denmark, Finland, France, Germany, Ireland, Italy, Luxembourg, Netherlands, Norway, Poland, Portugal, Russia, Spain, Sweden, Switzerland, UK, United States and Mexico).

Kelkoo Group is headquartered in London, UK; with operating offices in Paris, Grenoble, Vilnius, Oslo and Milan. Richard Stables became chief executive officer (CEO) of Kelkoo Group in 2009.

== Company history ==
Kelkoo was founded in 1999 by Pierre Chappaz, Jérôme Mercier and Mauricio Lopez. Initial funding of $3 million was provided by Banexi Ventures and Innovacom. Once Kelkoo merged with three other European businesses, it absorbed those founders into one single collective, consisting of Per Siljubergsåsen, William Klippgen, Philip Wilkinson, and Jorge Garcia.

In April 2000, within days of each other, Kelkoo merged with Spanish-based Dondecomprar.com and UK based competitor ShopGenie, founded by Philip Wilkinson. In September of the same year, Kelkoo merged with Norway-based Zoomit.com, paying the Zoomit-shareholders in shares amounting to a third of Kelkoo's total equity making Zoomit.com the largest entity within "new" Kelkoo.

In June 2003, the company partnered with the European arm of the Microsoft site MSN to provide shopping listings. A similar deal was announced in June 2004 with Ask.com (formerly Ask Jeeves).

On 26 March 2004, Kelkoo was bought by Yahoo! Inc for €450 million. Yahoo explained this move as providing advertisers with the ability to target individual products.

In November 2008, Kelkoo was sold by Yahoo! Inc to the private equity firm Jamplant Ltd.

In October 2016, Kelkoo acquired LeGuide group, the price comparison market leader in France. This newly formed group of two historical players had a major impact on the industry, with Kelkoo becoming the European leader in shopping comparison, a unique international position.

== Business model ==
Kelkoo has been profitable since Q4 2002. Similar to other price comparison services in how it operates, Kelkoo has focused much of its marketing on capturing users through SEO and launching partner sites including ITV's PriceTerrier.com.

In addition to being a price comparison site, Kelkoo also offers an API webservice where other price comparison websites, such as PriceSpin.com shopping comparison website, and SmartShoppers price comparison browser add-on, use data and content from Kelkoo's database. This is a shared revenue business model. Kelkoo offers an affiliate commission to the partner sites who use their data for every qualified click that they generate.

Kelkoo launched their Brazil website in 2012, deciding on Brazil as a market over India and China.

=== In popular culture ===
In October 2005, a book on Kelkoo appeared in French called Ils ont réussi leur start-up! La success-story de Kelkoo. written by Julien Codorniou and Cyrille de Lasteyrie.

== See also ==
- Tickex
- BeatThatQuote.com
- ShopLocal
- Liligo.com
