= Sramana Mitra =

Sramana Mitra is an Indian-born writer and columnist who founded One Million by One Million (1Mby1M).

== Early life and education ==
Mitra was born and grew up in Calcutta, India. Her father was an owner of a shipping business. At the age of 18, she moved from India to the United States to attend Smith College, where she graduated in computer science and economics in 1993. She then earned a Master of Science in electrical engineering and computer science at the Massachusetts Institute of Technology (MIT) in 1995. Her thesis was supervised by Anant Agarwal and it was focused on a tool for measuring the performance of parallel programs running on the Alewife multiprocessor and for debugging them.

== Career ==
Mitra founded her first company, DAIS, in Calcutta in 1994 while she was still a graduate student at MIT. By 1996, she had moved to Silicon Valley. In 1997, she founded her second company, Intarka, which raised venture capital from New Enterprise Associates. Intarka was based in San Jose and developed ProspectMiner.

In 1999, Mitra started Uuma, an online fashion retailer for women that was built around personalization.

Mitra started a blog, Sramana Mitra on Strategy, in 2005. From 2008, she spent about three years as a Forbes columnist. She has also written for Harvard Business Review and Inc. She is also the author of Entrepreneur Journeys series.

In 2008, Mitra began holding online roundtables at which entrepreneurs could pitch their businesses to her and receive feedback. In 2010, she founded One Million by One Million (written 1M/1M and later 1Mby1M), with the goal of helping one million entrepreneurs each reach US $1 million in annual revenue by 2020, and the roundtables became part of the program. The program is run online. In 2015, the Delaware Economic Development Office also joined the program.

== Personal life ==
Mitra also paints, and she studied under Ramananda Bandopadhyay, an artist of the Bengal School.
