= Michael Robert Blakey =

Singapore-based British entrepreneur and technology investor

- Born: London, England
- Occupations: Entrepreneur, Investor

Michael Robert Blakey (born 1975 in London, United Kingdom) is a Singapore-based British entrepreneur and technology investor who was named UK Angel Investor of the Year in 2015 by the UK Business Angels Association. Blakey co-founded Avonmore Developments Ltd. in London in 2000, followed by Cub Capital Pte. Ltd. in Singapore in 2013. In 2016, Blakey joined William Klippgen to start Cocoon Capital - a venture capital firm targeting early-stage digital startups in Southeast Asia. The firm has so far raised two funds with an AUM of US$27m.

== Education ==
Blakey holds a Bachelor of Arts degree from the College of William & Mary.
