= Yaoota =

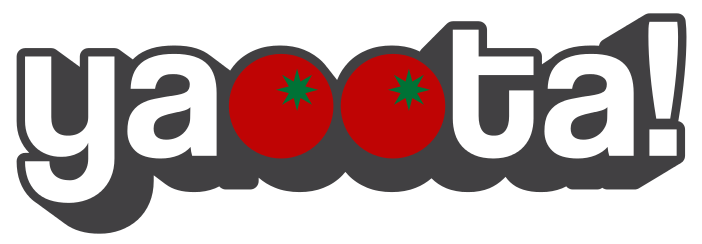
- Company type: Limited
- Available in: English, Arabic
- Founded: 2014
- Headquarters: Cairo, Egypt
- Key people: Sherif ElRakabawy (CEO/CTO), Mohamed Ewis (CFO)
- Industry: E-Commerce
- Employees: 40+
- Website: yaoota.com

Yaoota (Arabic: ياقوطة) is an Egyptian search engine for products sold online in Egypt. The engine, which was referred to by Forbes as the “Egyptian Version of Google Shopping”, made headlines in October 2015 upon securing the largest Series A investment in Egypt from UAE-based private equity KBBO Group, only one year post-launch. It was also featured in a separate Forbes ranking as number 2 of the 20 Most Promising Egyptian Startups. The choice of the name Yaoota, which translates roughly to “Crazy Tomatoes”, mirrors the Egyptian culture, which relies on an all too familiar street vendor shout out in street markets that mocks the volatility of tomato and vegetable prices.

== History ==
Yaoota was founded by Sherif ElRakabawy and Mohamed Ewis. The engine was developed in the midst of a turbulent political and security environment, during the aftermath of the January 25 Revolution. The name of the company behind the engine - Flying Elephant Lab - was inspired by an article by New York Times columnist Thomas Friedman, in which he describes the occurrence of Egyptian revolution with a metaphor of watching an elephant fly.

== Technology ==
The Yaoota engine uses a proprietary algorithm that works similar to Google's search technology. It scrapes the web to fetch specific product data, and makes it available for users to search from.

== Acquisitions ==
In June 2017, Yaoota acquired MENA's leading phone specification discovery platforms mobihall.com and mobilesgate.com, establishing Yaoota as a leading online shopping and discovery platform in the Middle East and North Africa. As of February 2019, Yaoota's footprint operates in Egypt, Saudi Arabia, United Arab Emirates, Kenya and Nigeria.
