= Priceza =

Thai shopping search engine

- Industry: Search Engine
- Founded: January 2010; 15 years ago in Bangkok, Thailand
- Founder: Thanawat Malabuppa; Vachara Nicatatphand; Wirod Supadul
- Headquarters: Bangkok, Thailand
- Website: https://www.priceza.com

Priceza is a shopping search engine and price comparison tool, with local websites in six Southeast Asian countries:

- Thailand (since 2010)
- Indonesia (since 2013),
- Malaysia,
- Singapore
- Philippines
- Vietnam.

The company was started in January 2010 in Bangkok, Thailand, by three computer science engineers: Thanawat Malabuppa, Vachara Nicatatphand, and Wirod Supadul. It is Thailand's first, and currently ranked at number one with 85% market share in the e-commerce business.

== Operations ==
Priceza operates in its markets by establishing business partnerships with merchants and retailers to provide information and price lists on a wide range of products. The company is partnered with companies like Lazada, Zalora, Central Group, Groupon, Rakuten, which has products in their price comparison database. As of 2014, the website has 5,000 stores on Priceza Thailand and another 5,000 stores on Priceza Indonesia, with a total amount of 1.6 million products in Thailand and two million products in Indonesia. In 2017, Priceza has launched the new service called "Priceza Money" accessible at money.priceza.com. The new service is a comparison platform of financial products such as car insurance, credit cards and personal loan. The service is available only in Thailand at the present. In the near future, Priceza Money expects to expand its platform on other financial products and services in order to meet user's need and enhance their financial management.

== Investments ==
In 2013 CyberAgent Ventures, a Japanese venture capital company, invested in Priceza.

In 2016 the venture arm of Hubert Burda Media, Burda Principal Investments invested in Priceza.
