= Buscapé =

- Company type: Private
- Industry: Internet services
- Founded: June 1999
- Headquarters: São Paulo, Brazil
- Number of employees: 600 (2010)
- Website: www.buscape.com.br

Buscapé is a comparison shopping service that operates in Latin America. It was co-founded in São Paulo, Brazil in 1999 by Romero Rodrigues, Rodrigo Borges, Ronaldo Morita and Mario Letelier.

It is currently ranked 1,313th globally and 37th in Brazil according to Alexa.com.

In July 2006, Buscapé merged with the Rio de Janeiro-based competitor Bondfaro.

In September 2009, Naspers acquired a 91% stake in Buscapé.
