= Tickex =

Tickex.com was a United States and UK based search engine dedicated to live event tickets; concerts, sports, and theatre. The business did not sell tickets directly to consumers, instead the search engine aggregated and displayed tickets from other sites then redirected the user to the chosen site for purchase. Tickex listed ticket vendors in both the primary and secondary ticket markets including companies Ticketmaster, StubHub, TicketsNow, eBay, Viagogo, and Tickets.com providing customers the ability to search, compare, and buy tickets based on price, location, and date.

In addition to the Tickex.com search engine the company maintained several other mediums for customers to access their inventory. Tickex provided desktop widgets which could be placed on any webpage and provided visitors of other sites access to the Tickex catalogue of tickets.

In November 2007 Tickex announced the launch of the GIG*gle application (re-branded as the Tickex application), which allowed Facebook users to search for live events, such as sports games, live theatre and concerts in the US or UK. The application also allowed users to see what tickets were available and see who among their friends was interested in attending.

The company was founded in 2006 by University of San Francisco graduate Daniel Brinderson. The privately held company was backed by a Southern California based private investor and raised $1.5 million in its initial round of investment.

Tickex operated solely in the UK before expanding operations to the US in the fall of 2006.
