= Google Shopping =

Internet marketplace operated by Google

- Logo used since 2025

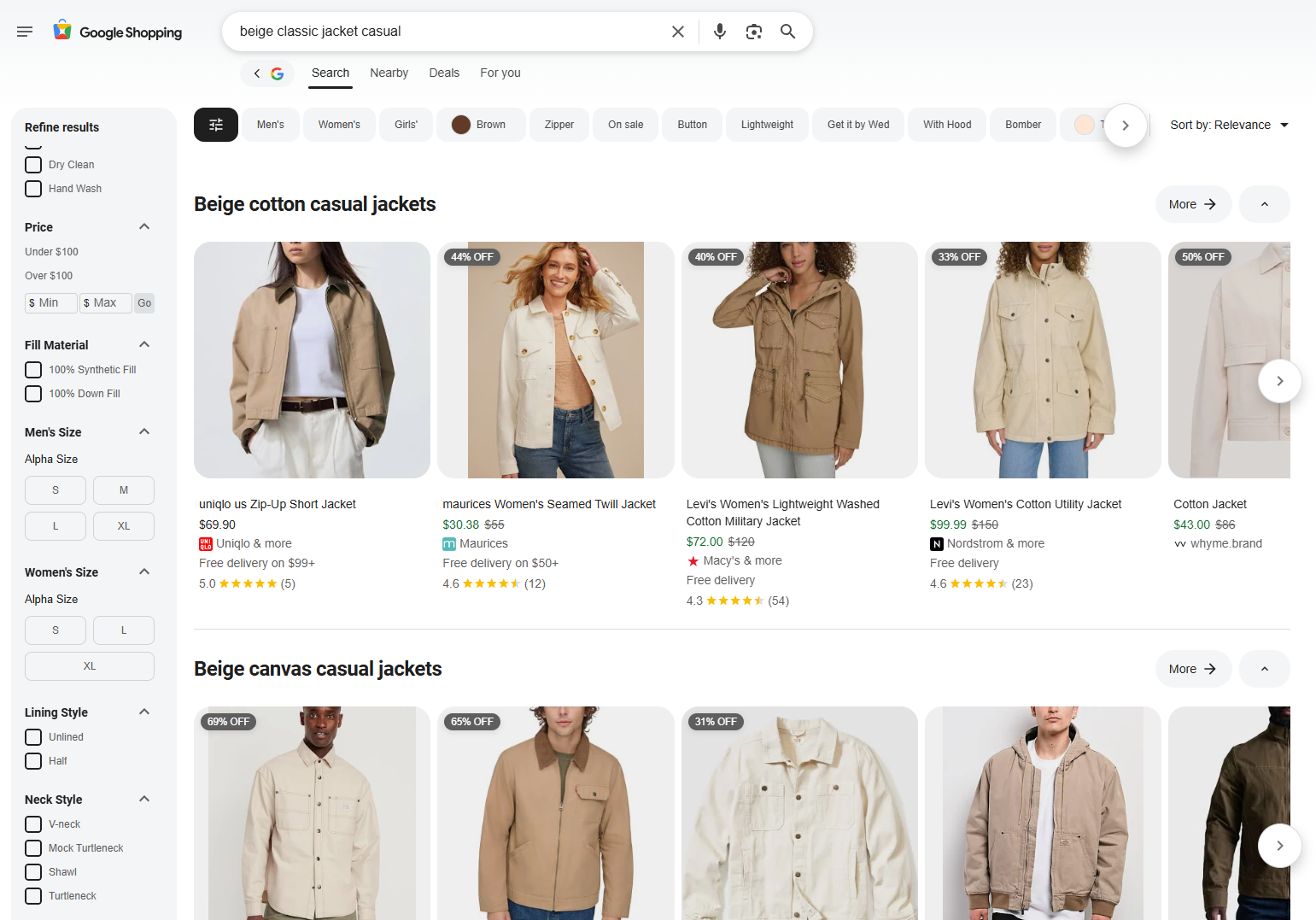
- Screenshot
- Website type: Price comparison
- Owner: Google LLC
- Creator: Craig Nevill-Manning
- Website: www.google.com/shopping
- Commercial: Yes
- Registration: Optional
- Launched: December 12, 2002; 23 years ago

Google Shopping, formerly Google Product Search, Google Products, and Froogle, is a Google service created by Craig Nevill-Manning which allows users to search for products on online shopping websites and compare prices between different vendors. Google announced at its Marketing Live event in May 2019 that the new Google Shopping would integrate the existing Google Express marketplace into a revamped shopping experience. In the US, Google Shopping is accessible from the web and mobile apps, available on Android and iOS. Google Shopping is also available in France, accessible from the web only. Like its predecessor, Google Shopping is free and requires a personal Google account in order to purchase from the platform. A colored price tag icon replaces the parachute icon of Google Express.

== Features ==
On the web, shoppers can either go to the Google Search homepage to enter a search query and then select the Shopping tab under the navigation bar, or go directly to the Google Shopping site to search for specific items, browse departments, and see trending items and promotional offers. The Google Shopping mobile app opens directly to the shopping homepage, where shoppers can similarly search or browse, and access their shopping lists, order history and notification settings. Currently, the product inventory available on the app is less robust than what is available on the web, since it currently reflects items shoppers can only buy directly on Google. In addition to shopping from well-known online stores, users can shop with confidence at lesser-known online stores when they choose to buy directly on Google, which includes a Google-backed guarantee. The guarantee includes Google customer support, available 7 days a week, and added assistance if the order is late, if something is wrong with the shipment, and to simplify the return and refund process - regardless of the seller. When on the web, shoppers can identify products they can buy on Google by either looking for the colored cart icon within a product image, or by selecting the Buy on Google filter. Free delivery is available on qualifying orders that meet the store's minimum order amount.

Shoppers can see personalized product recommendations and promotional offers on the Google Shopping homepage depending on their Google account settings. Other features geared to help shoppers find the best prices and places to buy include the ability to track the price of a product, compare the total order cost at online or nearby stores, and access product reviews and related video content.

Over the coming year, additional shopping capabilities will be rolled-out and tied into other Google products and platforms in order to simplify a shopper's buying journey.

== History ==
=== Froogle (2002 – 2007) ===
Created by Craig Nevill-Manning and launched in December 2002, Froogle was different from most other price comparison services in that it used Google's web crawler to index product data from the websites of vendors instead of using paid submissions. As with Google Search, Froogle was instead monetized using Google's AdWords keyword advertising platform.

=== Google Product Search (2007 – 2013) ===
With its April 2007 re-branding as Google Product Search, the service was modified to emphasize integration with Google Search; listings from the service could now appear alongside web search results.

Google prominently featured the service result in Google Search starting in January 2008 in Germany and the United Kingdom. It subsequently extended the practice to France in October 2010, Italy, the Netherlands, and Spain in May 2011, the Czech Republic in February 2013 and Austria, Belgium, Denmark, Norway, Poland and Sweden in November 2013.

Originally, the service listed prices submitted by merchants, and was monetized through AdWords advertising like other Google services. However, in May 2012, Google announced that the service (which was also immediately renamed Google Shopping) would shift in late-2012 to a paid model where merchants would have to pay the company in order to list their products on the service.

=== Google Shopping (2013 – present) ===
Logo from 2019-2025

Alongside the announcement of an immediate re-brand to Google Shopping on May 31, 2012, Google also announced that in late 2012, it would change the service to use a "pay-to-play" model, where merchants would have to pay Google to list their products on the service, with results influenced by both relevance and the bid amounts they pay. Google justified the move by stating that it would allow the service to "deliver the best answers for people searching for products and help connect merchants with the right customers."

The change proved controversial; some small businesses showed concern that they would not be able to compete with larger companies that can afford a larger advertising budget. Microsoft's Bing also attacked the move in an advertising campaign known as "Scroogled," which called Google out for using "deceptive advertising practices" and suggesting that users use its competing Bing Shopping service instead.

Google also revealed plans to integrate Google Catalogs with Google Shopping, to give users "more ways to find ideas and inspiration as you shop and engage with your favorite brand."

In June 2017, Google Shopping was fined a record €2.4 billion by the EU Commission for giving its own online shopping services top priority in search results. The fine was finally upheld by the CJEU in 2024.

In March 2018, Google introduced Shopping Actions, a commission based model, where customers can shop "on the Google Assistant and Search with a universal cart, whether they're on mobile, desktop, or even a Google Home device"

Initial case studies on the impact of Shopping Actions vs Google Shopping alone show positive results, with higher Average Order Value, increase in basket size, and higher revenue to merchants.

== Naming ==

Google Shopping was originally known as Froogle, a pun on the term "frugal." On April 18, 2007, the product was renamed Google Product Search; the original name was dropped due to concerns surrounding internationalization, people not understanding the pun or understanding what the service was actually about, and concerns related to the company's trademark infringement lawsuit against competing website Froogles. On May 31, 2012, the product was renamed to Google Shopping. The URL "froogle.com" remains as a redirect to Google Shopping's website.

== Antitrust fine ==
On June 27, 2017, the European Commissioner for Competition, Margrethe Vestager, fined Google €2.4 billion for breaching EU antitrust rules. Google was found to have abused its market dominance as a search engine by giving illegal advantages to another Google product, its own comparison shopping service.

According to the European Commission, Google started giving its own Froogle significantly better treatment than rivals as early as 2008. It first began in Germany and the United Kingdom, followed by France, Italy, the Netherlands, Spain, then the Czech Republic and finally Austria, Belgium, Denmark, Norway, Poland and Sweden. A total of up to 418 million citizens of the European Economic Area are claimed to have been deprived of the full benefits of competition, genuine choice and innovation.

In 2021, the General Court upheld the fine and the ruling was upheld in 2024, closing the case.

== Countries ==
Google Shopping is currently available in 121 countries and territories:

== See also ==
- Comparison shopping website
