= PriceGrabber =

PriceGrabber.com, LLC
- Company type: Subsidiary
- Industry: Internet Services : Comparison Shopping : Distributed Content Commerce
- Founded: 1999; 27 years ago
- Founder: Tamim Mourad; Kamran Pourzanjani
- Headquarters: Los Angeles, California, U.S.
- Key people: Steve Krenzer (CEO); Jeff Goldstein (president, Rojeh Avanesian, SVP of Sales and Marketing); Dominique Jean (CTO)
- Parent: Connexity
- Website: connexity.com

PriceGrabber.com is a price-comparison shopping site and distributed content commerce service founded in 1999 by former CEOs Kamran Pourzanjani and Tamim Mourad. The company partners with merchants, retailers, and sellers to provide information on a wide range of products. PriceGrabber.com was the first comparison-shopping engine to project tax and shipping cost information for a consumer during the price comparison process.

== Acquisitions ==
In 2005, PriceGrabber was acquired by Experian for $485 million, negotiated by then-CEO and founder of the company, Kamran Pourzanjani, along with Tamim Mourad, in 1999.

In 2012, Experian agreed to sell PriceGrabber at a significant loss to Indian group Ybrant Digital. After the sale fell through, Experian announced in October of that year that it had completed the sale of PriceGrabber, LowerMyBills, and ClassesUSA.com to the management team of those businesses for an undisclosed amount.

In June 2015, Connexity (formerly Shopzilla) announced it had purchased PriceGrabber, Inc. for an undisclosed amount.
