= Docstoc =

Defunct electronic document repository and online store

- Company type: Private
- Website type: Social Software
- Available in: English
- Founded: Los Angeles, California, United States (August 2007)
- Headquarters: Santa Monica, California, USA
- Key people: Jason Nazar (CEO, Co-Founder), Alon Shwartz (CTO, co-founder)
- Services: Document sharing and publishing, with a focus on small businesses
- Website: Docstoc.com
- Current status: Closed

Docstoc (stylized as .docstoc) was an electronic document repository and online store, aimed at providing professional, financial and legal documents for the business community. It closed in 2015. Users could upload, share and sell their own documents, or purchase professional documents written in-house by professionals and lawyers.

== History ==
Docstoc was officially launched by co-founders Jason Nazar (CEO) and Alon Shwartz (CTO) in October 2007. Docstoc began as a resource for sharing documents (including .doc, .pdf and .ppt formats), and allowed users to embed documents on their blog or website. Docstoc announced its emergence from beta on May 13, 2009 and introduced several new features, including revenue sharing with users through advertisements. Docstoc was initially compared to content sharing databases such as Scribd, but after its departure from beta evolved into a resource focused on the needs of business owners. The company expanded rapidly in 2011, and employing over 30 people at that point.

== Technology ==
The original Docstoc technology allowed users to upload, share or embed documents on their website. Features such as DocShots allowed users to hover over an embedded document link and view a preview without having to download it. Documents could also be set to private, and shared with selected people.

In 2010, The Docstore Marketplace was launched, and Docstoc encouraged professional users such as lawyers, accountants and real estate brokers to earn revenue from selling their own business documents on the site. Users could sell their commercial documents (such as contracts, business templates, technical guides or academic papers) and split the revenue with Docstoc. All of these seller documents had to be approved by Docstoc before being placed in the Docstore, in order to manage professional quality. Document owners could also register for DocCash, a service which generated 50/50 revenue from advertisements between Docstoc and the user.

In 2011, Docstoc focused on producing its own high-quality business content, with the goal of creating 10,000 professional documents internally by the end of that year; these premium documents were in addition to the over 20 million documents already uploaded by users. It also developed partnerships with content providers such as LegalZoom and ProQuest Dissertations, and produced its own articles and videos featuring tips for business professionals. For users interested in frequent use, the website launched Docstoc Premium, a subscription service that allows users to access premium business documents and packages using credits, and surf the website without advertisements. Users could also access Docstoc Premium documents remotely through the iPad app, which was launched in May 2011.

== Financing ==
In November 2007, a month after their launch, Docstoc received 750k in Series A funding from investors including Scott Walchek, Brett Brewer, Matt Coffin, Robin Richards, and Crosscut Ventures. Docstoc then raised 3.25 million in their Series B round in April of the following year. The company was claimed to be profitable in 2010, and according to CEO Jason Nazar, had been doubling in revenue over the previous three years, despite stock losses at the time.

== Traffic ==
DocStoc's CEE was quoted by CNN Money in February 2010 saying that the DocStoc database held 13 million documents, was getting twenty million visitors per month, and hosting a million downloads per month. In 2011, the website reported hosting over 20 million user documents and growing from 3 million registered users to over 11 million users.

== Acquisition ==
Intuit, maker of financial products like Quickbooks and TurboTax, announced its planned acquisition of Docstoc in 2011.

== Shutdown ==
Intuit decided in 2015 to reduce its activity, and to shut down Docstoc by the end of the year. DocStoc announced in September 2015 that it was no longer taking new registrations on their home page, prior to closure. To download a form one must register, but registrations are not accepted, so one effectively cannot download forms anymore unless one is already a registered user. On December 1, 2015 Docstoc.com was shut down.
