= Google Catalogs =

Shopping application for tablet computers

- Available in: English
- Owner: Google
- Creator: Google
- Website: www.google.com/catalogs
- Registration: Optional, included with a Google Account
- Launched: August 16, 2011; 15 years ago
- Current status: Discontinued in August 2015

Google Catalogs was a shopping application for tablet computers, which was produced by Google in August 2011. Google Catalogs delivered virtual catalogs to users from merchants like Nordstrom, L.L. Bean, Macy's, Pottery Barn, and many more. Merchants were added through a process by which they submitted a form with information and a sample of their catalog, which was then reviewed by Google's editorial team. The application was noted as a "Greener Way to Shop", as the digitization of catalogs substituted for paper versions.

Google announced the intent to discontinue the iPad app effective August 2013 and eventually shut down the project entirely in August 2015, almost half a year after it was announced to shut down.

== History ==
Google Catalog search was first conceptualized in December, 2001 as a search function on the web only. This was a free Google service. Catalog search was a major digitization project for Google, as thousands of merchant catalogs were scanned and made accessible to the public. Users were able to flip through pages of catalogs from a variety of industries, except those that focus on liquor, tobacco, firearms, or similar products. Google ended this service on the web in January, 2009 stating: "Catalog Search hasn't been as popular as some of our other products. So tomorrow, we're bidding it a fond farewell and focusing our efforts to bring more and more types of offline information such as magazines, newspapers and of course, books, online". On August 16, 2011 Google Catalogs was announced on Google's official blog, and was immediately available for download. Google created a short video as an overview of the features of the product. On October 1, 2012, Google made Google Catalogs available on the web.

== User experience (UX) ==
The catalogs available on this application were grouped by several product categories, including Women's Fashion and Apparel, Jewelry, Beauty, Home, Men's Fashion and Apparel, Kids and Baby, and Gifts. After choosing a product category, users could select a specific catalog, which then brought them to the cover page of that catalog.

Shoppers using the iPad could flip through the catalog and tap on "hotspots" for the products in which they are interested, linking to the merchant's Web site for purchase. After clicking on a product of interest, a pop-up will appear for the user to read more about the product, which includes price, description, images, and title. This is also the page where users could send information about the product to others via email. For those who didn't want to purchase online, store locations can be found by loading the 'Find Nearby' option. Further exploration of the products was supported by features such as the ability to zoom in on products as well as being able to view tags to garner additional information. In addition, products could be marked as favorites, and then all of those that were previously marked could be viewed on the same page by clicking the Favorites button on the bottom of the screen. Users could also mark specific catalogs as Favorites in order to receive a notification when a new issue was available. If a user was looking for a specific product, there was a search function that showed all the products related to the keyword that the user types in.

== User interaction ==
In the early stages of this Google product, users had the ability to send product information and images they find on the application to any person with an email address, regardless of whether or not they have the app. Users were also able to create collages of their favorite products across catalogs on their Android powered tablets or iPads. Once users had either created a collage they could share these with friends, in the same way they could share product information and images that they found interesting. In addition to this, users can create public collages that can be viewed by anyone with the application.

== Platforms ==
Google Catalogs was once accessible on desktops, Android, and iOS. It was shut down in August 2015.

== Monetization ==
Participating merchants did not have to pay a fee in order to have their catalogs included in this app. Additionally, users of Google Catalogs did not have to pay to search through the collection of catalogs that are provided in the app. Users did, however, have to have a Gmail account in order to sign-in and save their favorite catalogs in the mobile/tablet apps.
