= Per Siljubergsåsen =

Norwegian entrepreneur and technologist

- Born: 1965

Per Siljubergsåsen (born 1965) is a Norwegian entrepreneur and technologist. He started the internet consultancy Mogul AS (merged and listed as Mogul AB on the Stockholm Stock Exchange in 2000). In 1997 he co-founded Zoomit/Kelkoo which became Europe’s leading shopping comparison search engine and Europe's third largest e-commerce site. Kelkoo was acquired by Yahoo Inc. in 2004. That same year, he co-founded Attentio SA, a market intelligence company focused on analyzing online social media. Per has a computer science degree from the University of Oslo and holds an MBA from the Vlerick Leuven Gent Management School.
