= UPG =

UPG may refer to:

- Union of the Gabonese People (Union du Peuple Gabonais)
- Unverified personal gnosis
- University of Pittsburgh at Greensburg
- UPG (gas station chain), in Ukraine
- Hasanuddin International Airport, Makassar, Indonesia (IATA airport code)
