= Filling station =

Facility that sells gasoline and diesel

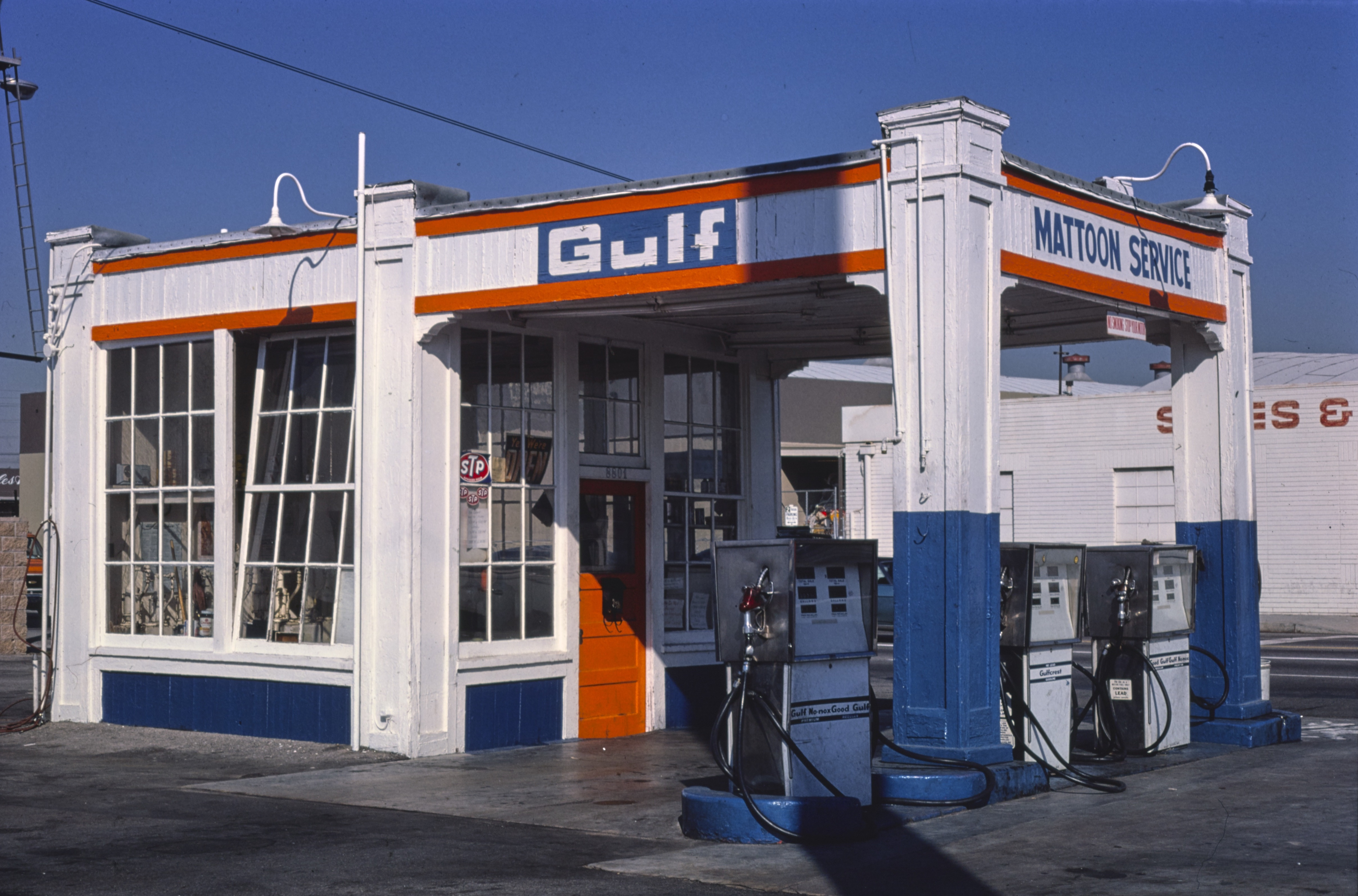
Pre-fabricated gas station, Culver City, California, US 1977

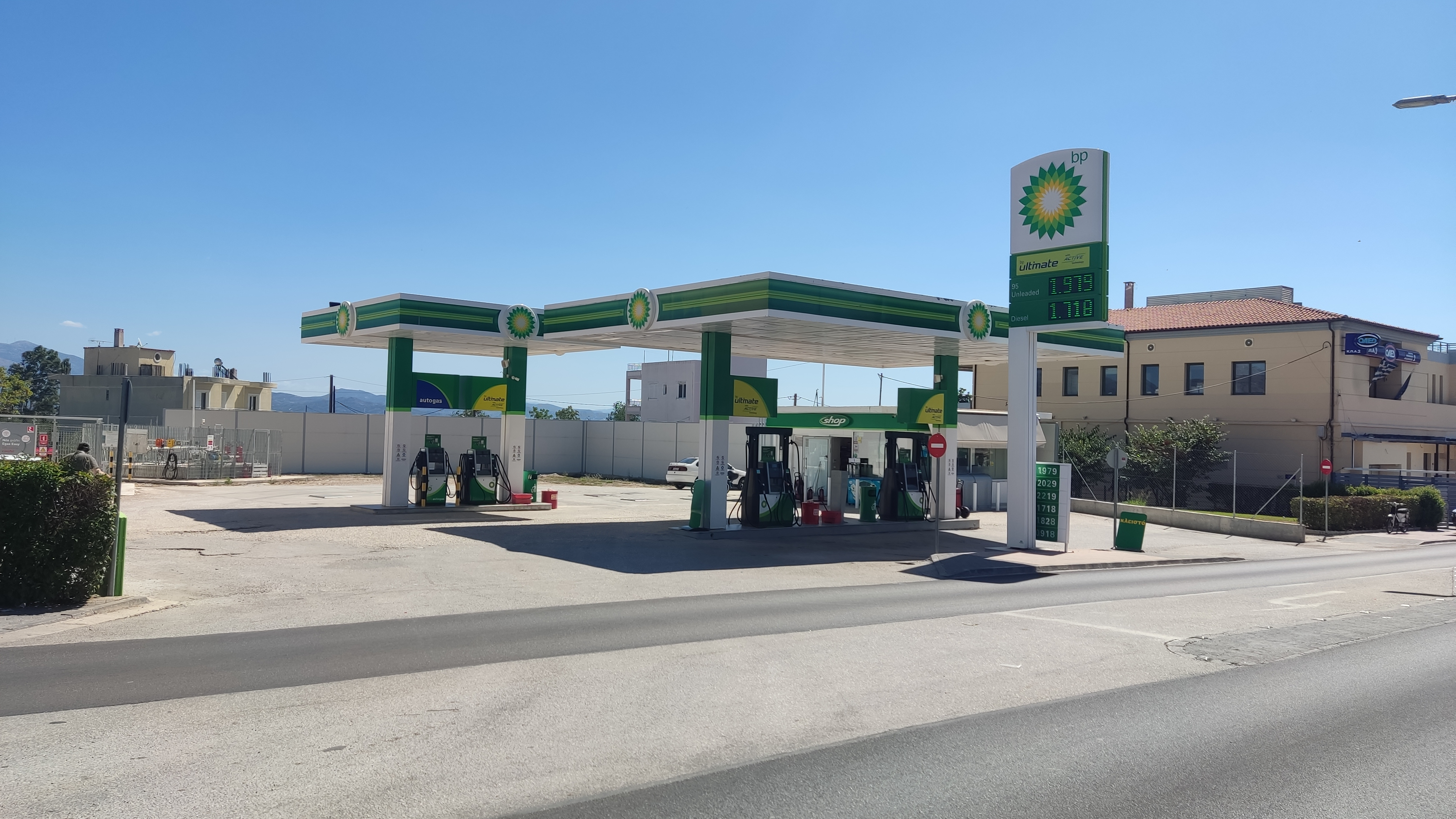
Filling station in Argos, Greece

A filling station (also known as a gas station [US/CA] or petrol station [UK/AU/NZ]) is a facility that sells fuel and engine lubricants for motor vehicles. It serves as a local fuel depot and retailer; it receives fuel products from refineries (via regular tank truck resupplies), stores the fuels in (typically underground) storage tanks, and distributes the fuel to motorist consumers at a daily varied price.

The most common fuels sold are motor fuels such as gasoline (petrol), often as multiple products with different octane ratings) and diesel fuel, as well as liquified petroleum gas (LPG, i.e. autogas), compressed natural gas, compressed hydrogen, hydrogen compressed natural gas, liquid hydrogen, kerosene, alcohol fuels (like methanol, ethanol, butanol, and propanol), biofuels (like straight vegetable oil and biodiesel), or other types of alternative fuels. Fuel dispensers are used to pump fuel into the vehicle's fuel tanks, gauge the volume of fuel transferred to the vehicle, and calculate the amount the consumer must pay. Another device found in filling stations and capable of refueling certain (compressed-air) vehicles is an air compressor. However, these are generally used to inflate car tires.

Many filling stations provide convenience stores, which may sell convenience food, beverages, tobacco products, lottery tickets, newspapers, magazines, and, in some cases, a small selection of grocery items, such as milk or eggs. Some also sell propane or butane and have added shops to their primary business. Conversely, some chain stores, such as supermarkets, discount stores, warehouse clubs, or traditional convenience stores, have provided fuel pumps on the site.

== Terminology ==
In North America, the colloquial generic term for motor fuels is "gasoline" or "gas" for short due to gasoline engines being the most ubiquitous car internal combustion engine, and the terms "gas station" and "service station" are used in the United States, Canada, and the Caribbean. In some regions of Canada, the term "gas bar" (or "gasbar") is used.

In the rest of the English-speaking world, the generic term for fuel is "petrol". Since 1860, Carless, Capel & Leonard of Hackney Wick, London had been making a petroleum distillate with specific gravity 0.68 as a mineral oil solvent. In the 1890s, Frederick Simms found that this distillate was ideal for Daimler's engines and suggested to Carless that they adopt "Petrol" as its brand name, which they did. Carless was unable to defend it as a trademark: in 1902 John Scott Montagu said that it was "always called amongst motorists 'petrol' and Gottlieb Daimler said that the term had been in use in England in the 1860s.

Thus the terms "petrol station" and "petrol pump" are used in the United Kingdom. In Ireland, New Zealand and South Africa "garage" and "forecourt" are still commonly used. Similarly, in Australia, New Zealand, the United Kingdom, and Ireland, the term "service station" describes any petrol station; Australians also call it a "servo". In India, Pakistan and Bangladesh, it is called a "petrol pump" or a "petrol bunk". In Japanese, a commonly used term is gasoline stand (Note: ガソリンスタンド, gasorin sutando; a wasei-eigo term) although the abbreviation SS (for service station) is also used.

== History ==
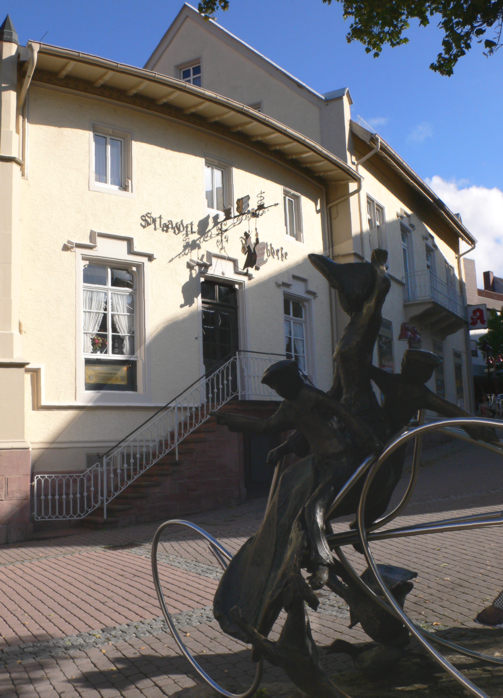
The world's first "filling station", the City Pharmacy in Wiesloch, Germany

In the early days of the internal-combustion engine, fuel for motor vehicles was sold in the same way as similar liquids, e.g. organic solvents, which is what the first motor fuel, Ligroin, was. That is why, when Bertha Benz wanted to refill the tank of the first automobile on her trip from Mannheim to Pforzheim in 1888, she visited the pharmacy in Wiesloch, where she bought Ligroin.

As the motor trade developed and standard products were adopted as fuels, businesses developed to support motorists by offering repair services and holding stocks of fuel for sale.

The first filling station, as now understood, appears to have been that opened in 1905 at 420, South Theresa Avenue, St. Louis, Missouri, USA.

=== Brazil ===
The first "posto de gasolina" of South America was opened in Santos, São Paulo, Brazil, in 1920. It was located on Ana Costa Avenue, in front of the beach, in a corner that is located by the Hotel Atlântico, which occupies its area nowadays. It was owned by Esso and brought by Antonio Duarte Moreira, a taxi entrepreneur.

=== Russia ===
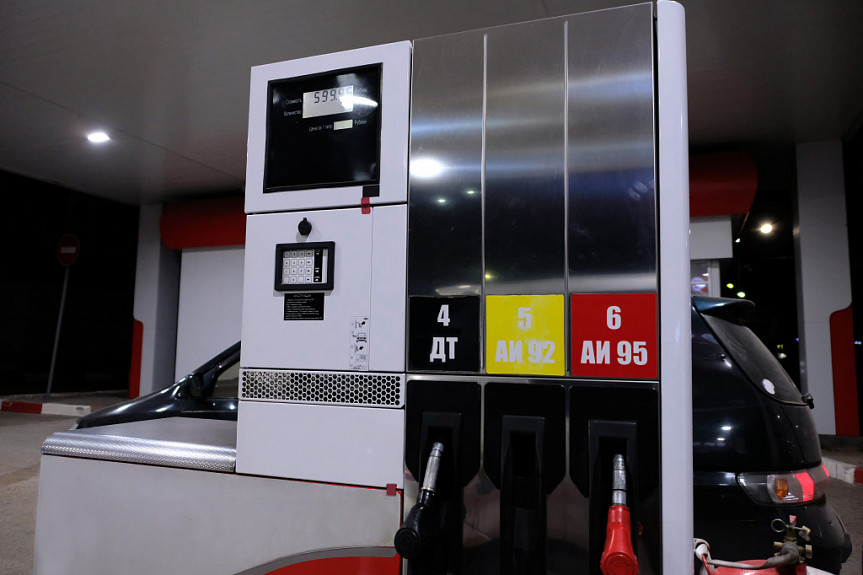
Modern gas station column. Russia

In Russia, the first filling stations appeared in 1911, when the Imperial Automobile Society signed an agreement with the partnership "Br. Nobel". By 1914, about 440 stations functioned in major cities across the country.

In the mid-1960s, in Moscow, there were about 250 stations. A significant boost in retail network development occurred with the mass launch of the car "Zhiguli" at the Volga Automobile Plant, which was built in Tolyatti in 1970. Gasoline for anything other than non-private cars was sold only with ration cards. This type of payment system stopped in the midst of perestroika in the early 1990s.

Since the saturation of automobile filling stations in Russia is insufficient and lags behind that of leading countries, there is a need to add new stations in cities and along roads at different levels.

=== Ukraine ===
During the Russian invasion of Ukraine, filling stations became part of the country's critical civilian infrastructure. Russian missile and drone attacks damaged or destroyed numerous retail fuel stations, particularly in frontline regions such as Dnipropetrovsk, Zaporizhzhia, Sumy, Kharkiv and Chernihiv oblasts. In July 2026, Reuters reported that Russian forces had intensified attacks on filling stations, striking multiple retail fuel sites in Dnipropetrovsk and Chernihiv oblasts. According to Ukrainian officials, the attacks were aimed at disrupting fuel supplies and logistics in frontline areas.

As a result of the Russian shelling of the UPG gas station network since the beginning of the full-scale invasion, approximately eight gas stations have been damaged, said Volodymyr Moroz, executive director of the network operator, PE Ukrpaletsystem, during a meeting of the Temporary Investigative Commission of the Verkhovna Rada chaired by People's Deputy of Ukraine Oleksiy Honcharenko. As a result of this damage, this and other networks are suffering large losses. All this to some extent affects the price of fuel. At the end of 2025, UPG became one of the three largest fuel retail chains in Ukraine after expanding its network to over 500 gas stations thanks to the lease of former ANP and Avias assets, approved by the Antimonopoly Committee of Ukraine.

At the end of June, WOG CEO and former Minister of Infrastructure Andriy Pyvovarsky noted that over the past two months, more than 150 gas stations have burned down in Ukraine. He added that oil depots and other fuel infrastructure facilities are attacked almost weekly

In June and July 2026, Russian forces carried out a series of attacks on gas stations (GAS) in various regions of Ukraine. According to the industry publication NaftoRynok, in June 2026, there was a significant increase in the number of attacks on Ukrainian gas stations. The publication noted that at the end of June, the number of affected or damaged gas stations reached an average of 15.5 facilities per week, and at the beginning of July, up to 20 gas station attacks per week were recorded.

=== United Kingdom ===
When the restrictions on cars were lifted in 1896, the storage and sale of petroleum spirit was controlled by the Petroleum Acts 1871 and 1879, under which local authorities licensed premises engaged in these activities. Businesses in the motor trade and early motorists with a stable of cars installed their own licensed tanks and pumps in accordance with these acts, e.g. Sir David Salomons' motor stable at Broomhill, Tunbridge Wells.

In 1900 the Home Office issued regulations which permitted the unlicensed sale and storage of petroleum spirit. It could be sold in metal containers of no more than 2 gallons capacity and up to 60 gallons could be stored in a ventilated outbuilding without a licence. Unlicensed retailers could sell it and the railway companies would transport it in cases which each held three 2-gallon cans. A motorist could order cases of petroleum spirit to be delivered to the nearest railway station and go and collect it (or send his chauffeur).

The first filling station in the UK was a drive-through station opened in 1919 by the Automobile Association on the Bath Road at Aldermaston.

=== United States ===
Before the drive-in filling station, automobile drivers pulled into almost any general or hardware store, or even blacksmith shops to fill up their tanks. Several years would elapse before checking oil, water, and selling tires would give rise to the concept of a gas "service" station.

The increase in automobile ownership after Henry Ford began selling automobiles the middle class could afford led to increased demand to refill them. The world's first purpose-built gas station was constructed in St. Louis, Missouri, in 1905 at 420 South Theresa Avenue. The second station was built in 1907 by Standard Oil of California (now Chevron) in Seattle, Washington, at what is now Pier 32. Reighard's Gas Station in Altoona, Pennsylvania claims that it dates from 1909 and is the oldest existing filling station in the United States. Early on, they were known to motorists as "filling stations" and often washed vehicle windows for free.

The first drive-in filling station in the U.S. was the 1912 Standard Oil of Ohio auto filling station at the corner of Young and Oak streets in Columbus, Ohio. The motorist drove in the front door, had his tank filled, and drove out the back. Whitehill-Gleason Motors, the first Gulf Refining Company drive-in station, opened to the motoring public in Pittsburgh on December 1, 1913, at Baum Boulevard and St Clair's Street. On its first day, the station sold 30 US gallons (110 L) of gasoline at 27 cents per gallon (7 cents per litre). This was also the first architect-designed station and the first to distribute free road maps.

The first alternative fuel station was opened in San Diego, California, by Pearson Fuels in 2003.

Maryland officials said that on September 26, 2019, RS Automotive in Takoma Park, Maryland became the first filling station in the country to convert to an EV charging station.

== Design and function ==
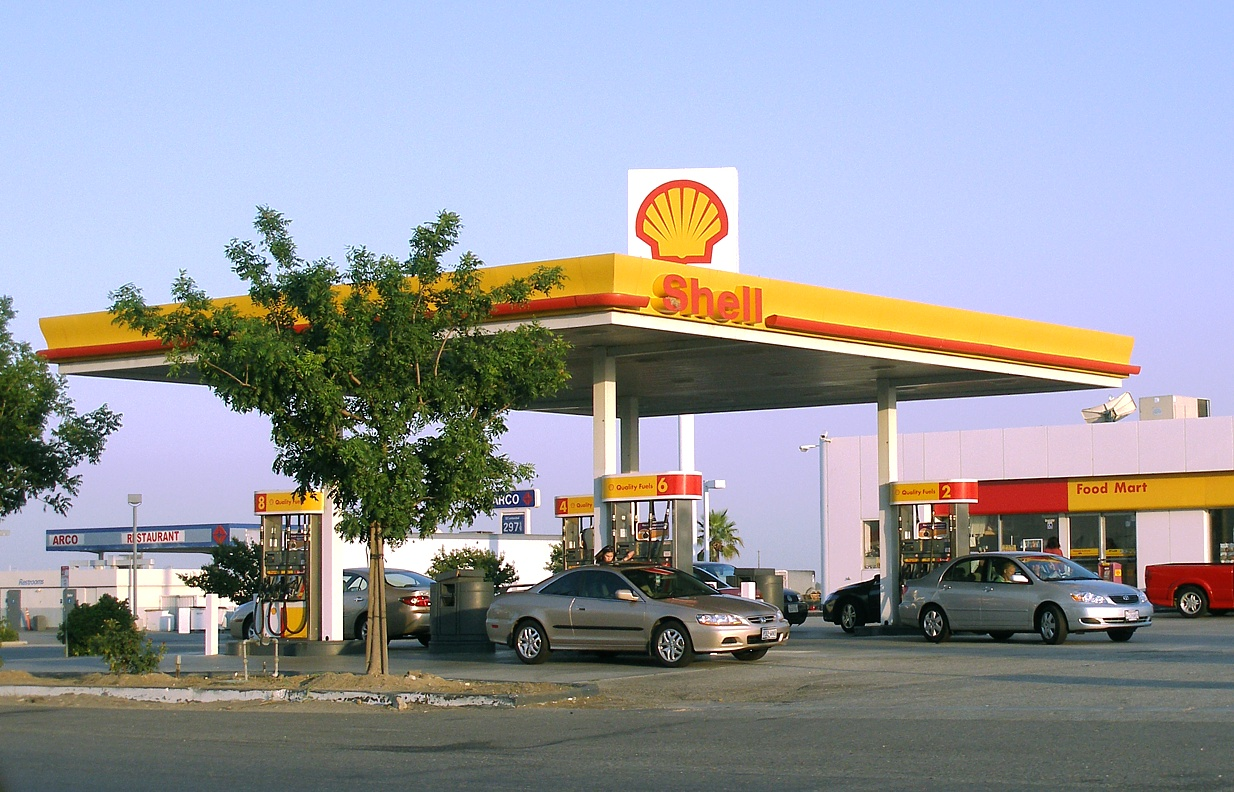
A Shell station near Lost Hills, California, US

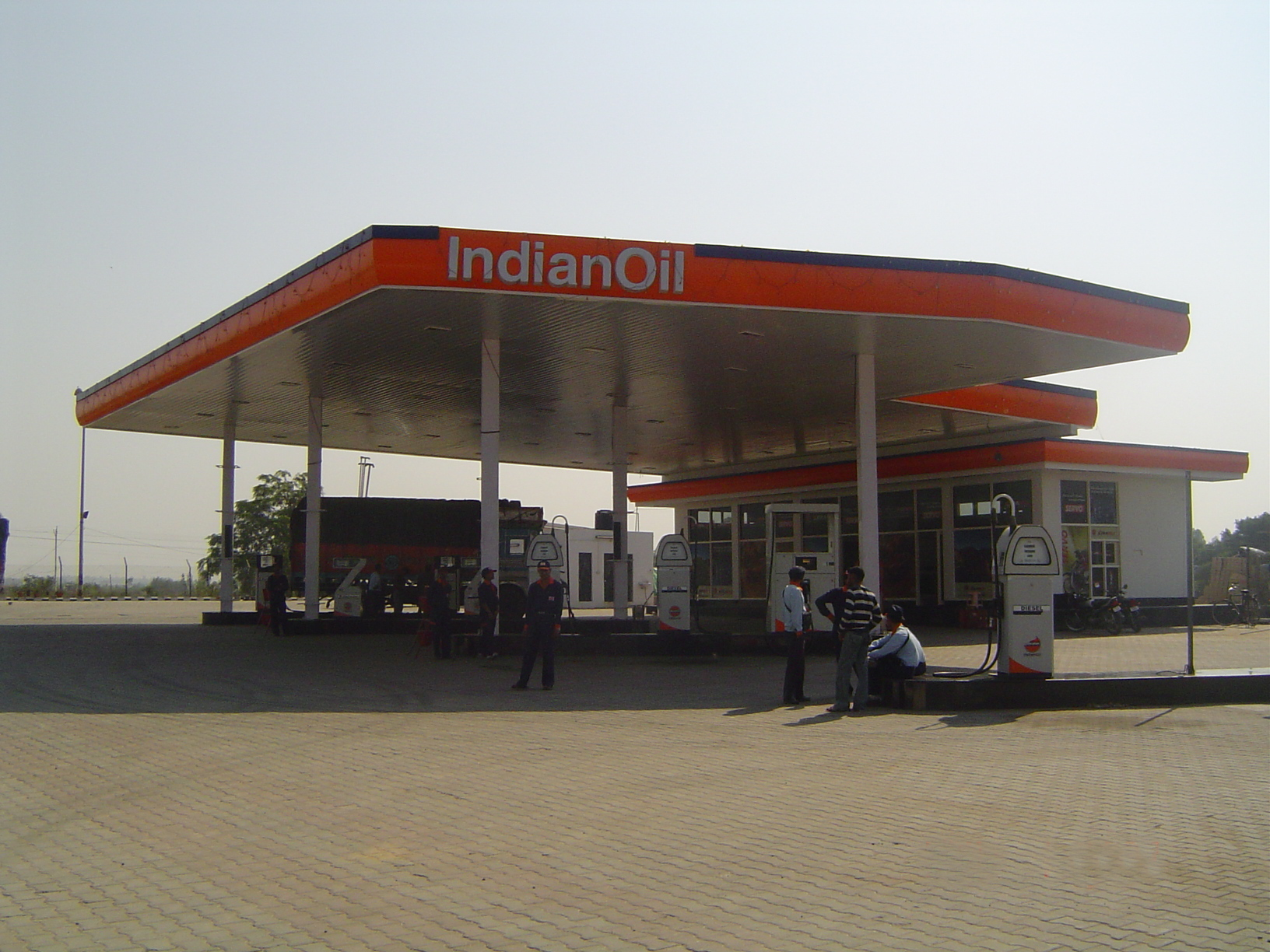
An IndianOil filling station near Dera Bassi in Punjab, India

The majority of filling stations are built in a similar manner, with most of the fueling installation underground, pump machines in the forecourt and a point of service inside a building. Single or multiple fuel tanks are usually deployed underground. Local regulations and environmental concerns may require a different method, with some stations storing their fuel in container tanks, entrenched surface tanks or unprotected fuel tanks deployed on the surface. Fuel is usually offloaded from a tanker truck into each tank by gravity through a separate capped opening located on the station's perimeter. Fuel from the tanks travels to the dispenser pumps through underground pipes. For every fuel tank, direct access must be available at all times. Most tanks can be accessed through a service canal directly from the forecourt.

Older stations tend to use a separate pipe for every kind of available fuel and for every dispenser. Newer stations may employ a single pipe for every dispenser. This pipe houses a number of smaller pipes for the individual fuel types. Fuel tanks, dispenser and nozzles used to fill car tanks employ vapor recovery systems, which prevents releases of vapor into the atmosphere with a system of pipes. The exhausts are placed as high as possible. A vapor recovery system may be employed at the exhaust pipe. This system collects the vapors, liquefies them and releases them back into the lowest grade fuel tank available.

The forecourt is the part of a filling station where vehicles are refueled. Gasoline pumps are placed on concrete plinths as a precautionary measure against collision by motor vehicles. Additional elements may be employed, including metal barriers. The area around the gasoline pumps must have a drainage system. Since fuel sometimes spills onto the pavement, as little of it as possible should remain. Any liquids present on the forecourt will flow into a channel drain before it enters a petrol interceptor which is designed to capture any hydrocarbon pollutants and filter these from rainwater which may then proceed to a sanitary sewer, stormwater drain, or to ground.

If a filling station allows customers to pay at the dispenser, the data from the dispenser may be transmitted via RS-232, RS-485 or Ethernet to the point of sale, usually inside the filling station's building, and fed into the station's cash register operating system. The cash register system gives limited control over the gasoline pump, and is usually limited to allowing the clerks to turn the pumps on and off. A separate system is used to monitor the fuel tank's status and the quantity of fuel. With sensors directly in the fuel tank, the data is fed to a terminal in the back room, where it can be downloaded or printed out. Sometimes this method is bypassed, with the fuel tank data transmitted directly to an external database.

=== Underground filling stations ===
The underground modular filling station is a construction model for filling stations that was developed and patented by U-Cont Oy Ltd in Finland in 1993. Afterwards, the same system was used in Florida, US. Above-ground modular stations were built in the 1980s in Eastern Europe and especially in the Soviet Union, but they were not built in other parts of Europe due to the stations' lack of safety in case of fire.

The underground modular filling station's construction model reduces installation time, simplifies design, and lowers manufacturing costs. As proof of the model's installation speed, U-Cont Oy Ltd set an unofficial world record for filling station installation when a modular filling station was built in Helsinki, Finland, in less than three days, including groundwork. The safety of modular filling stations has been tested in a filling station simulator, in Kuopio, Finland. These tests have included, for instance, burning cars and explosions in the station simulator.

== Negative impacts ==
=== Human health ===
Gasoline contains a mixture of BTEX hydrocarbons (benzene, toluene, ethylbenzene, xylenes). Prolonged exposure to toluene can cause permanent damage to the central nervous system, and chlorinated solvents can cause liver and kidney problems. Benzene in particular causes leukemia and is associated with non-Hodgkin lymphoma and multiple myeloma. People who work in filling stations, live near them, or attend school close to them are exposed to fumes and are at increased lifetime risk of cancer, with risk increased if there are multiple stations nearby. There is some evidence that living near a filling station is a risk for childhood leukemia. In addition to long-term exposure, there are bursts of short-term exposures to benzene when tanker trucks deliver fuel. High levels of benzene have been detected near stations across urban, suburban, and rural environments, though the causes (such as road traffic or congestion) can vary by location.

Gas station attendants have suffered adverse health consequences depending on the type of fuel used, exposure to vehicle exhaust, and types of personal protective equipment (PPE) offered. Studies have noted higher levels of chromosomal deletions and higher rates of miscarriage, and workers have reported headaches, fatigue, throat irritation and depression. Exposure to exhaust and fumes has been associated with eye irritation, nausea, dizziness, and cough.

=== Environment ===
Gasoline can leak into the surrounding soil and water, posing many health risks. Areas formerly occupied by filling stations are often contaminated, resulting in brownfields and urban blight. Underground storage tanks (USTs) were typically made of steel and were common in the United States, but were prone to corrosion. They began to receive national attention in 1983 after an episode of 60 Minutes documented significant drinking water contamination from a Mobil gas station in the Canob Park neighborhood of Richmond, Rhode Island. It had been determined that the station's underground tanks had been leaking gasoline into the local water system since the station opened in 1968. This led to regulations banning these types of tanks in 1985. However, tanks at gas stations that ceased operation before 1986 are unlikely to have been recorded, and many old underground gasoline and oil storage tanks are thus unknowingly buried beneath redeveloped land, contributing to soil, groundwater, and indoor air pollution.

Because of the relatively small size of former stations (compared to larger brownfields), the cost-per-acre to rehabilitate the land is higher; the total cost in the United States is not known but is in the billions of dollars. Individual cleanups may be complex, with some in Canada taking decades and costing millions of dollars both for the cleanup efforts and in legal fees to determine whether individuals, governments, or corporations are liable for costs.

=== Economic costs ===
The cost of potential cleanup of a former filling station can lower property values, discourage development of land, and depress neighbouring property values and potential tax revenue. When areas are known to be contaminated by leaking underground storage tanks, the sale value of the land and neighbouring area drops. An analysis of residential properties in Cuyahoga County, Ohio estimated the loss at about 17% when within 300 feet (91 m) or one block of a registered leaking tank. Active filling stations have similar negative effects on property values, with an analysis in Xuancheng, China finding a loss of 16% within 100 metres (330 ft) and 9% when between 301 metres (988 ft) and 600 metres (2,000 ft).

== Marketing ==
=== North America ===
In the United States and Canada, there are generally two marketing types of filling stations: premium brands and discount brands.

==== Premium brands ====
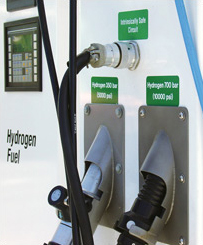
Hydrogen fueling nozzle

Filling stations with premium brands sell well-recognized and often international brands of fuel, including Exxon/Mobil and its Esso brand, Phillips 66/Conoco/76, Chevron, Mobil, Shell, Husky Energy, Sunoco (US), BP, Valero and Texaco. Non-international premium brands include Petrobras, Petro-Canada (owned by Suncor Energy Canada), QuikTrip, Hess, Sinclair, and Pemex. Premium-brand stations accept credit cards, often issue their own company cards (fuel cards or fleet cards) and may charge higher prices. In some cases, fuel cards for customers with a lower fuel consumption are ordered not directly from an oil company, but from an intermediary. Many premium brands have fully automated pay-at-the-pump facilities. Premium stations tend to be highly visible from highway and freeway exits, utilizing tall signs to display their brand logos.

==== Discount brands ====
Discount brands are often smaller, regional chains or independent stations, offering lower fuel prices. Most purchase wholesale commodity gasoline from independent suppliers or the major petroleum companies. Lower-priced stations are also found at some supermarkets (Albertsons, Kroger, Big Y, Ingles, Lowes Foods, Giant, Weis Markets, Safeway, Hy-Vee, Vons, Meijer, Loblaws/Real Canadian Superstore, and Giant Eagle), convenience stores (7-Eleven, Circle K, Cumberland Farms, QuickChek, Road Ranger, Sheetz, Speedway and Wawa), discount stores (Walmart, Canadian Tire) and warehouse clubs (Costco, Sam's Club, and BJ's Wholesale Club). At some stations (such as Vons, Costco, BJ's Wholesale Club, or Sam's Club), consumers are required to hold a special membership card to be eligible for the discounted price, or pay only with the chain's cash card, debit card or a credit card issuer exclusive to that chain. In some areas, such as New Jersey, this practice is illegal, and stations are required to sell to all at the same price. Some convenience stores, such as 7-Eleven and Circle K, have co-branded their stations with one of the premium brands. After the Gulf Oil company was sold to Chevron, northeastern retail units were sold off as a chain, with Cumberland Farms controlling the remaining Gulf Oil outlets in the United States.

=== State-controlled stations ===
Some countries have only one brand of filling station. In Malaysia, Shell is the dominant player by number of stations, with government-owned Petronas coming in second. In Indonesia, the dominant player by number of stations is the government-owned Pertamina, although other companies such as TotalEnergies and Shell are increasingly found in big cities such as the capital Jakarta or Surabaya. In Taiwan, the government-owned CPC Corporation is the dominant player by number of stations, with the privately owned and operated Formosa Petrochemical Corporation and NPC respectively in second and third place.

=== Global and local branding ===
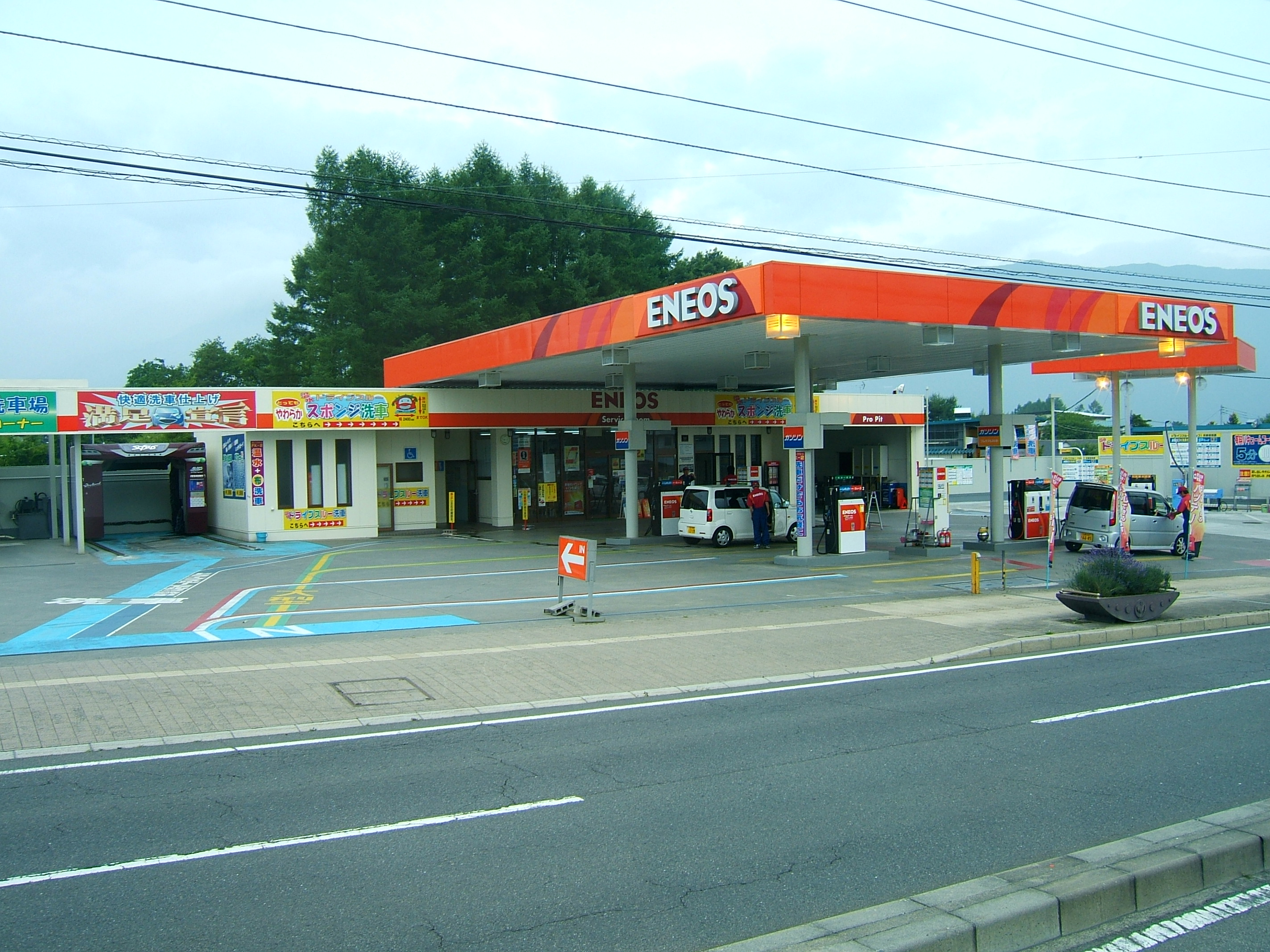
An ENEOS filling station near Mount Fuji in Japan

Some companies, such as Shell, use their brand worldwide, however, Chevron uses its inherited brand Caltex in Asia Pacific, Australia and Africa, and its Texaco brand in Europe and Latin America. ExxonMobil uses its Exxon and Mobil brands but is still known as Esso (the forerunner company name, Standard Oil or S.O.) in many places, most noticeably in Canada and Singapore.

In Brazil, the main operators are Vibra Energia and Ipiranga, but Esso and Shell (Raízen) are also present.

In Mexico, the historical monopoly filling station operator, and still the largest, is Pemex, but ever since Mexico's energy laws were gradually liberalized starting from 2013, foreign brands such as Shell, BP, Mobil and Chevron, as well as the country's largest convenience store chain Oxxo, have also started operating filling stations.

In the United Kingdom, the three largest are BP, Esso and Shell; the "Big Four" supermarket chains, Morrisons, Sainsbury's, Asda and Tesco, also operate filling stations, as well as some smaller supermarket chains such as The Co-operative Group and Waitrose.

In Poland, the three largest operators are the partially state-owned PKN Orlen (including acquisitions Grupa Lotos and PGNiG), followed by Shell and BP. Smaller operators include Auchan, AVIA International, Circle K, MOL Group and Żabka.

In Australia, the major operators are Ampol, BP, Chevron Australia (Caltex), EG Australia, ExxonMobil Australia (Mobil), Puma Energy, United Petroleum and Viva Energy (mostly under the dual Shell-Coles Express branding). Smaller operators include Costco, Liberty Oil, Seven & i Holdings (operates servos under the 7-Eleven convenience store branding) and Shell Australia.

In India, the three major operators are the state-owned Hindustan Petroleum, Bharat Petroleum and Indian Oil Corporation, which together control approximately 87% of the market. Foreign brands such as BP (joint venture with Reliance Industries, branded as Jio-bp) and Shell are also present.

In Japan, the four major operators are: Cosmo Oil, Idemitsu (under the brand names apollostation and Idemitsu), ENEOS Corporation (under the brand names ENEOS, Express and General) and San-Ai Oil (under the brand name Kygnus). Smaller operators include: Japan Agricultural Cooperatives (under the brand name JA-SS, except in Hokkaido where the brand name is Hokuren-SS (ホクレンSS) operated by Hokuren Federation of Agricultural Cooperatives) and Mitsubishi Group (operates self-service stations under the Lawson convenience store branding). Previously, foreign filling station brands were also present in Japan: mainly Shell (operated by Idemitsu since its acquisition of Showa Shell Sekiyu in 2018–19, all rebranded to apollostation by 2023), Esso and Mobil (last operated by ENEOS Corporation under license from ExxonMobil, all rebranded to ENEOS in 2019).

== Payment methods ==
=== Australia and New Zealand ===
Most service stations allow the customer to pump the fuel before paying. In recent years, some service stations have required customers to purchase their fuel first. In some small towns, the customer may hand the cash to the attendant on the forecourt if they are paying for a set amount of fuel and have no change; but usually customers will enter the service centre to pay a cashier. Some supermarkets have their own forecourts which are unmanned and payment is pay-at-pump only. Customers at the supermarket will receive a discount voucher which offers discounted fuel at their forecourt. The amount of discount varies depending on the amount spent on groceries at the supermarket, but normally starts at 4 cents a litre.

In New Zealand, BP has an app for smartphones that detects a user's location, then allows one to select the type of fuel, which pump, and how much to spend. The amount is then deducted from the user's account.

=== Canada ===
In British Columbia and Alberta, it is a legal requirement that customers either pre-pay for the fuel or pay at the pump. The law is called "Grant's Law" and is intended to prevent "gas-and-dash" crimes, where a customer refuels and then drives away without paying for it. In other provinces, payment after filling is permitted and widely available, though some stations may require either a pre-payment or a payment at the pump during night hours.

=== Ireland ===
In the Republic of Ireland, most stations allow customers to pump fuel before paying. Some stations have pay-at-the-pump facilities.

=== United Kingdom ===
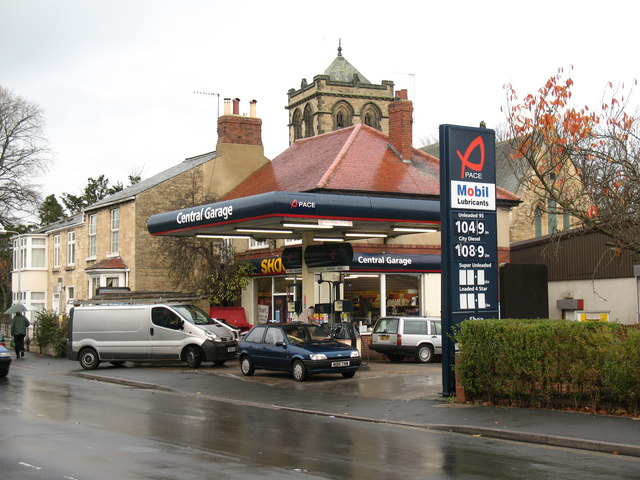
A small independent filling station in Boston Spa, West Yorkshire, England

A large majority of stations allow customers to pay with a chip and pin payment card or pay in the shop. Many have a pay at the pump system, where customers can enter their PIN prior to refueling.

=== United States ===
Pre-payment is the norm in the US and customers may typically pay either at the pump or inside the gas station. Modern stations have pay-at-the-pump functions: in most cases credit, debit, ATM cards, fuel cards and fleet cards are accepted. Occasionally a station will have a pay-at-the-pump-only period per day, when attendants are not present, often at night, and some stations are pay-at-the-pump only 24 hours a day.

== Types of service ==
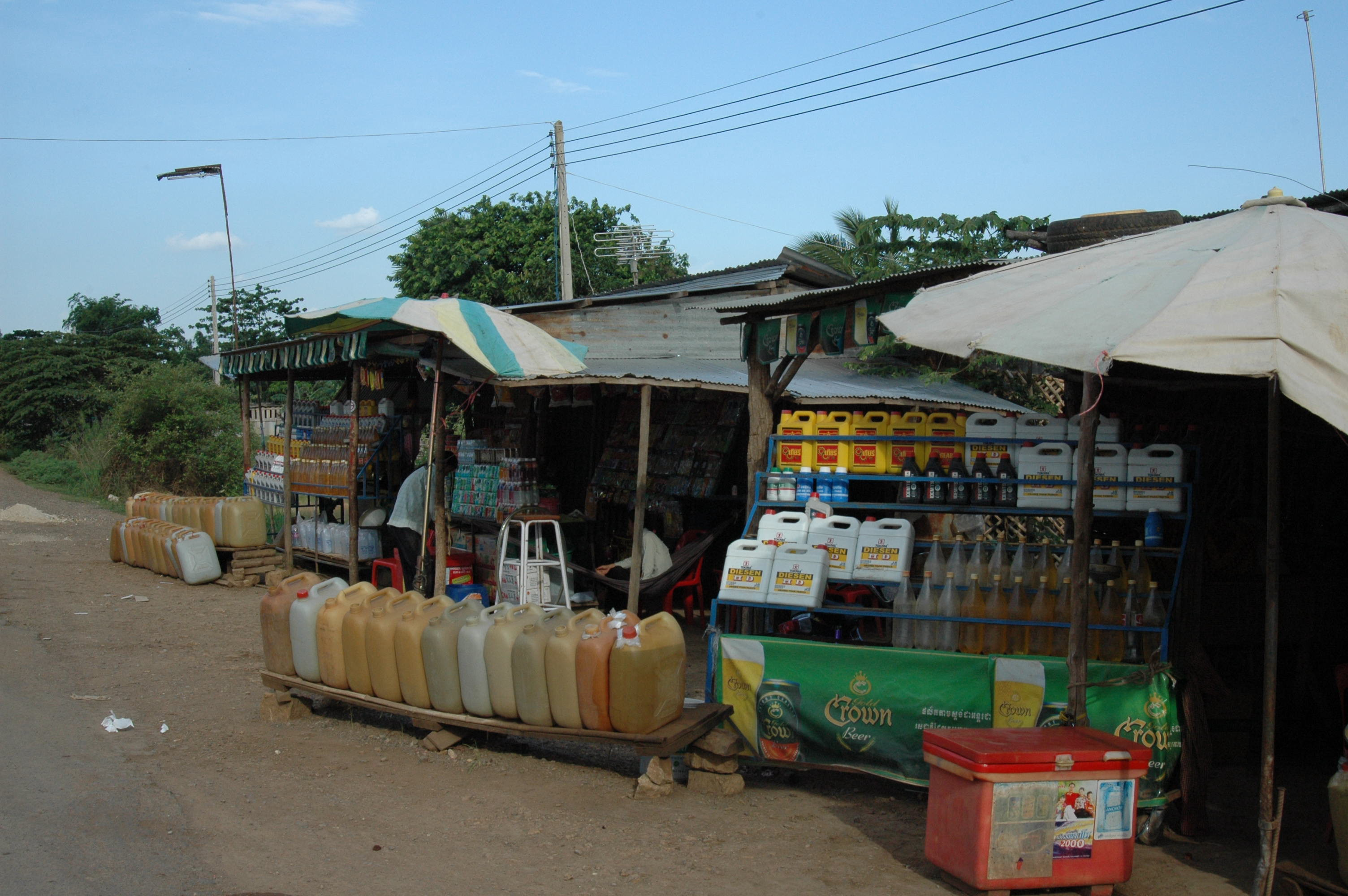
A filling station on the road from the Thai border to Siem Reap, Cambodia

Filling stations typically offer one of three types of service to their customers: full service, minimum service or self-service.

Full service
An attendant operates the pumps, often wipes the windshield, and sometimes checks the vehicle's oil level and tire pressure, then collects payment and perhaps a small tip.

Minimum service
An attendant operates the pumps. This is often required due to legislation that prohibits customers from operating the pumps.

Self service
The customer performs all required service. Signs informing the customer of filling procedures and cautions are displayed on each pump. Customers can still enter a store or go to a booth to give payment to a person.

Unstaffed
Using cardlock (or pay-at-the-pump) system, these are completely unstaffed.

=== Brazil ===
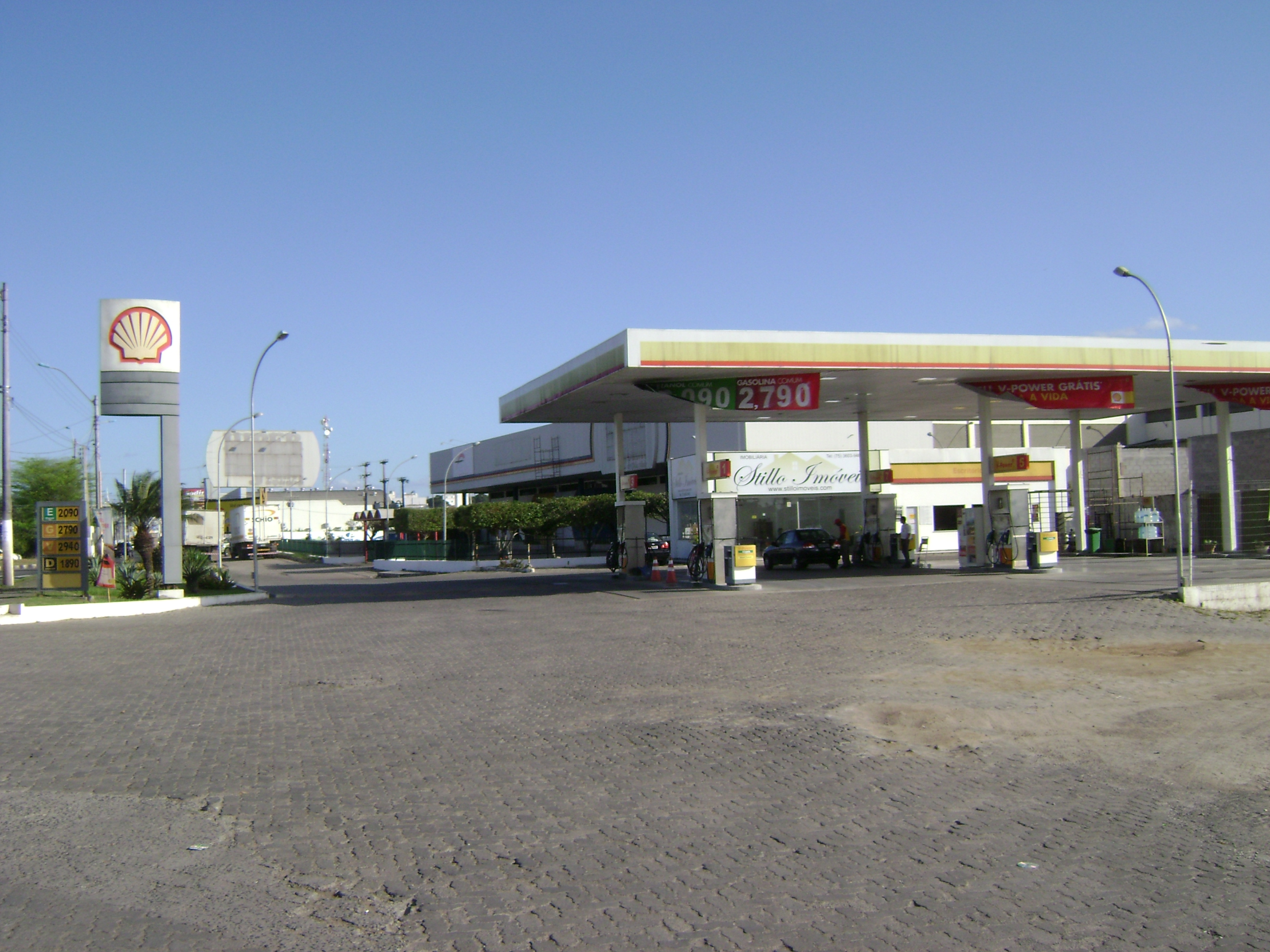
Royal Dutch Shell station in Feira de Santana, Brazil

In Brazil, self-service fuel filling is illegal, due to a federal law enacted in 2000. The law was introduced by Federal Deputy Aldo Rebelo, who claims it saved 300,000 fuel attendant jobs across the country.

=== Japan ===
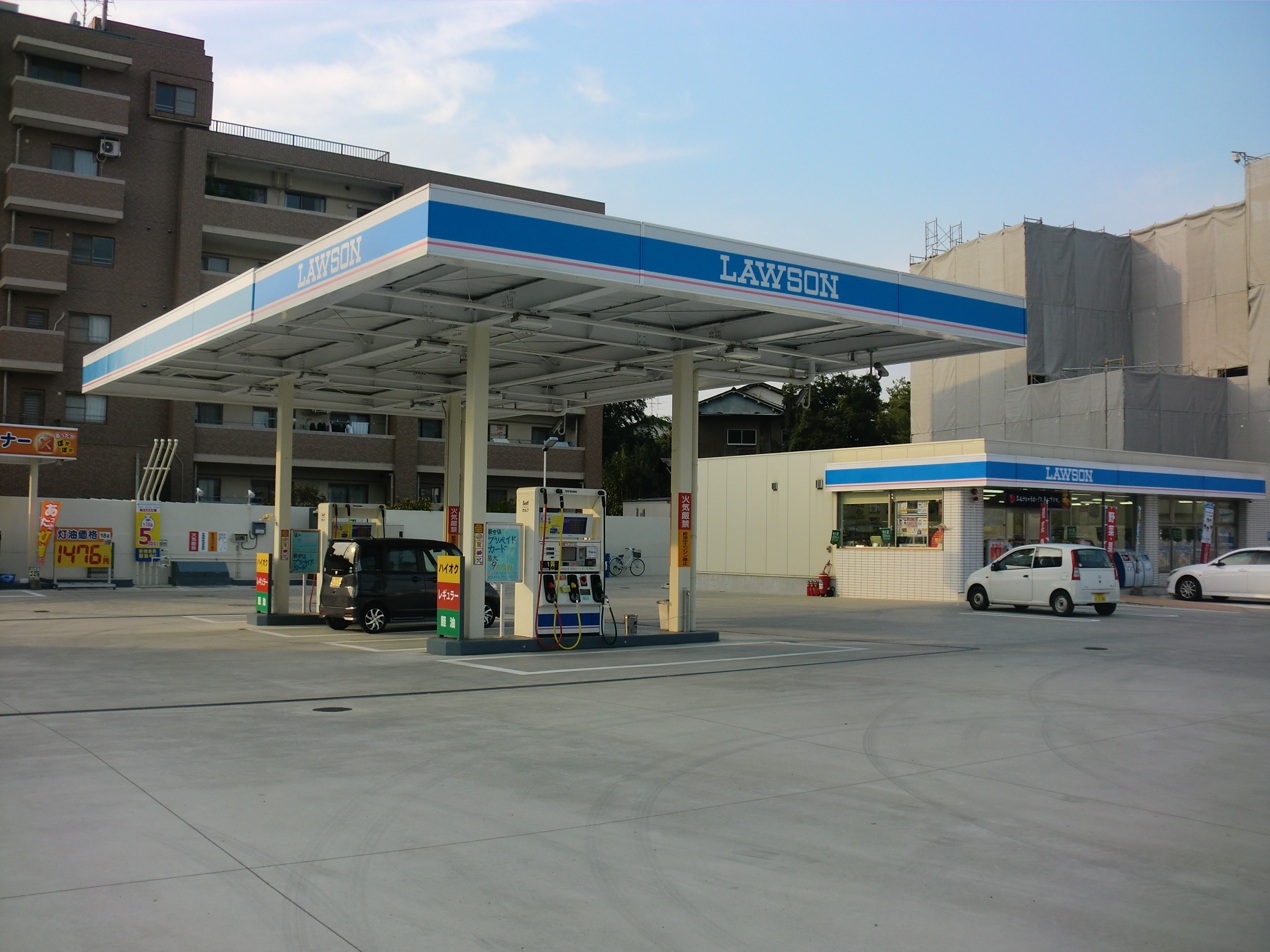
A Lawson self-service station with attached convenience store in Shingū, Fukuoka, Japan

Before 1998, filling stations in Japan were entirely full-service stations. Self-service stations were legalized in Japan in 1998 following the abolition of the Special Petroleum Law, which led to the deregulation of the petroleum industry in Japan. Under current safety regulations, while motorists are able to self-dispense fuel at self-service stations, generally identified in Japanese as serufu (セルフ), at least one fuel attendant must be on hand to keep watch over potential safety violations and to render assistance to motorists whenever necessary.

=== South Korea ===
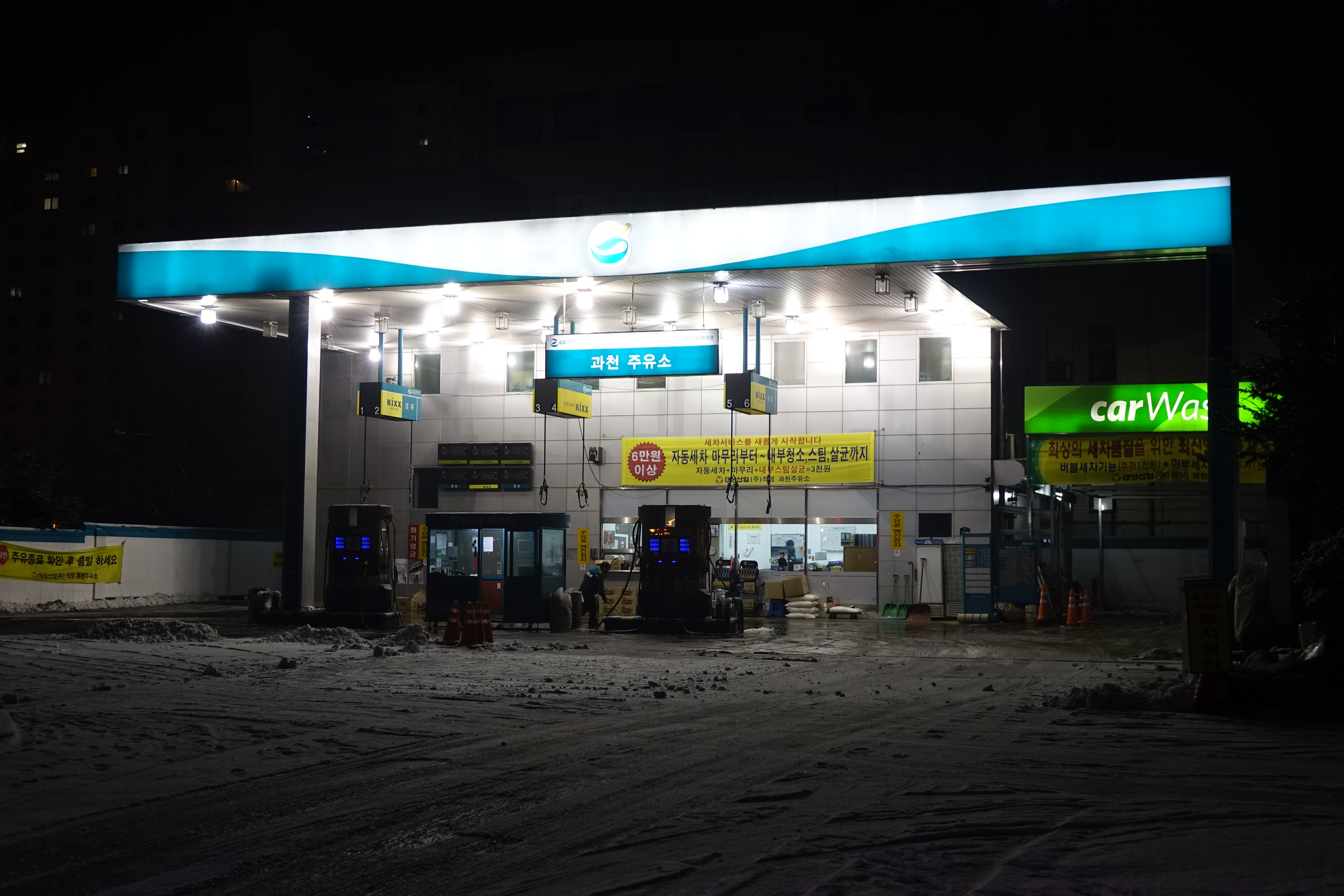
GS Caltex full-service station in Gwacheon, Gyeonggi, South Korea

Filling stations in South Korea offer a variety of services, such as providing bottled water or tissues, and cleaning free of charge. But most have switched to self-service. Some large full-service stations have many services, such as tire pressure charging, automatic car washing, and self-cleaning. Some of them are free to gas customers who spend more than a certain amount.

=== North America ===
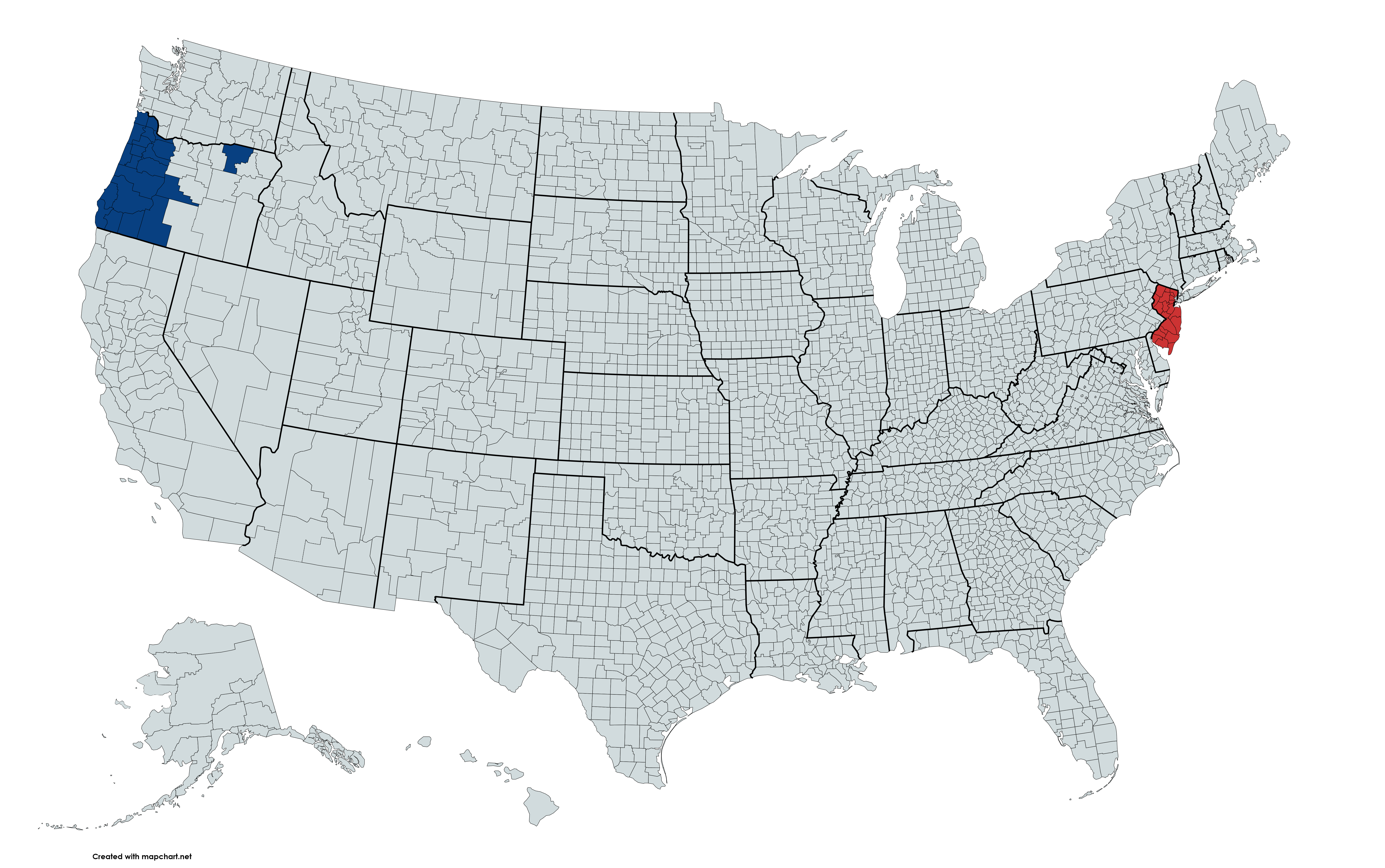
Red counties do not permit self-service. Blue counties require full-service, but allow stations to permit self-service.

In the past, filling stations in the United States offered a choice between full service and self service. Before 1970, full service was the norm, and self-service was rare. Today, few stations advertise or provide full service. Full service stations are more common in wealthy and upscale areas. The cost of full service is usually assessed as a fixed amount per US gallon.

The first self-service station in the United States was in Los Angeles, opened in 1947 by Frank Urich. In Canada, the first self-service station opened in Winnipeg, Manitoba, in 1949. It was operated by the independent company Henderson Thriftway Petroleum, owned by Bill Henderson.

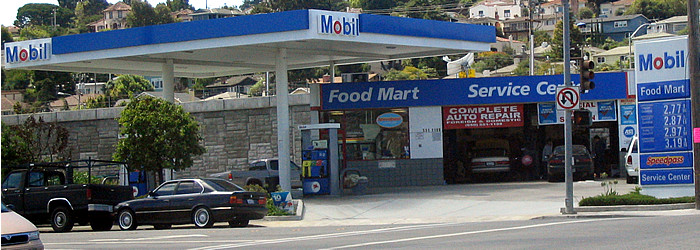
A typical US filling station, like this Mobil station in Belmont, California

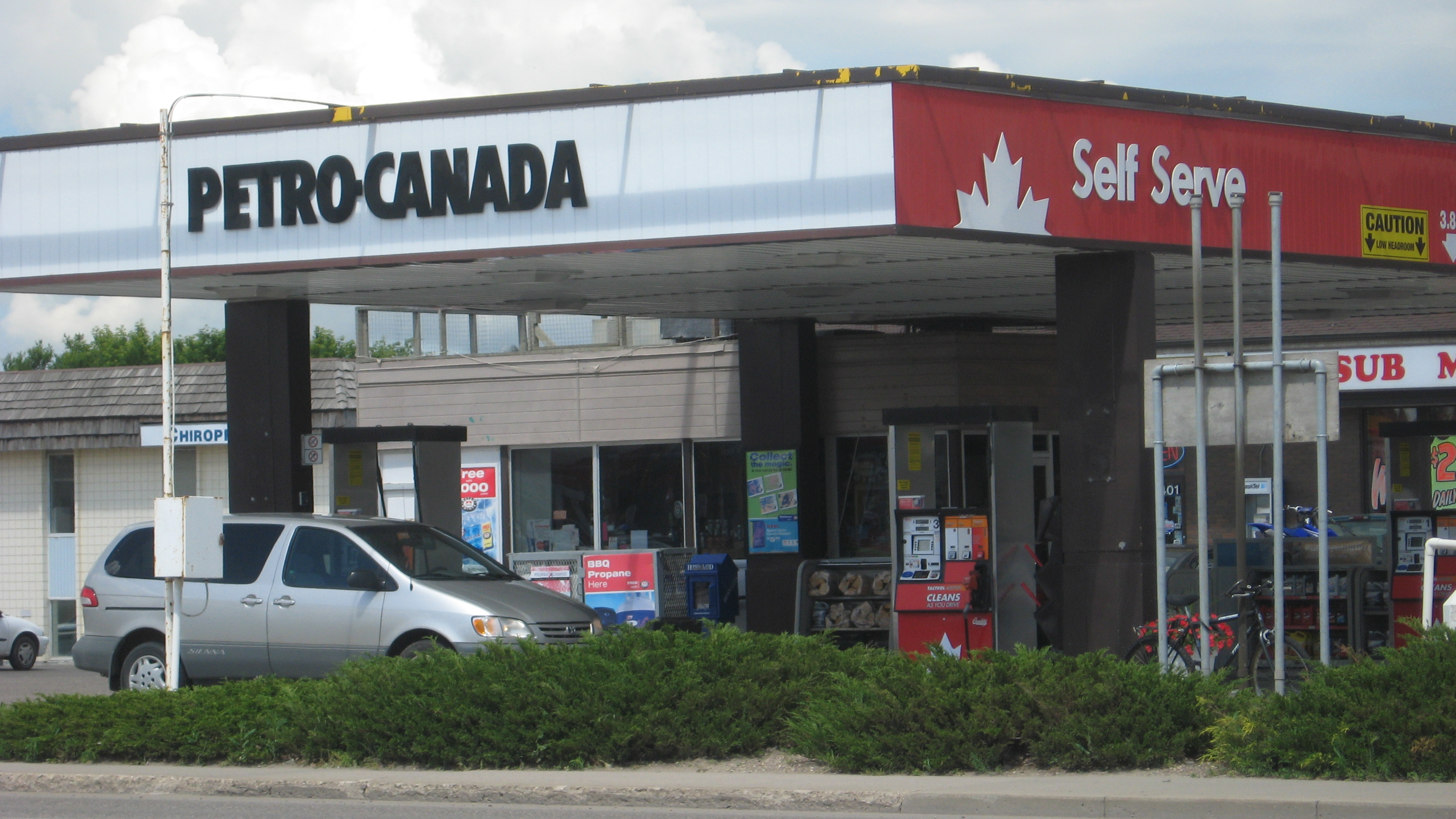
A typical Canadian station, like this Petro-Canada station in Saskatoon, Saskatchewan

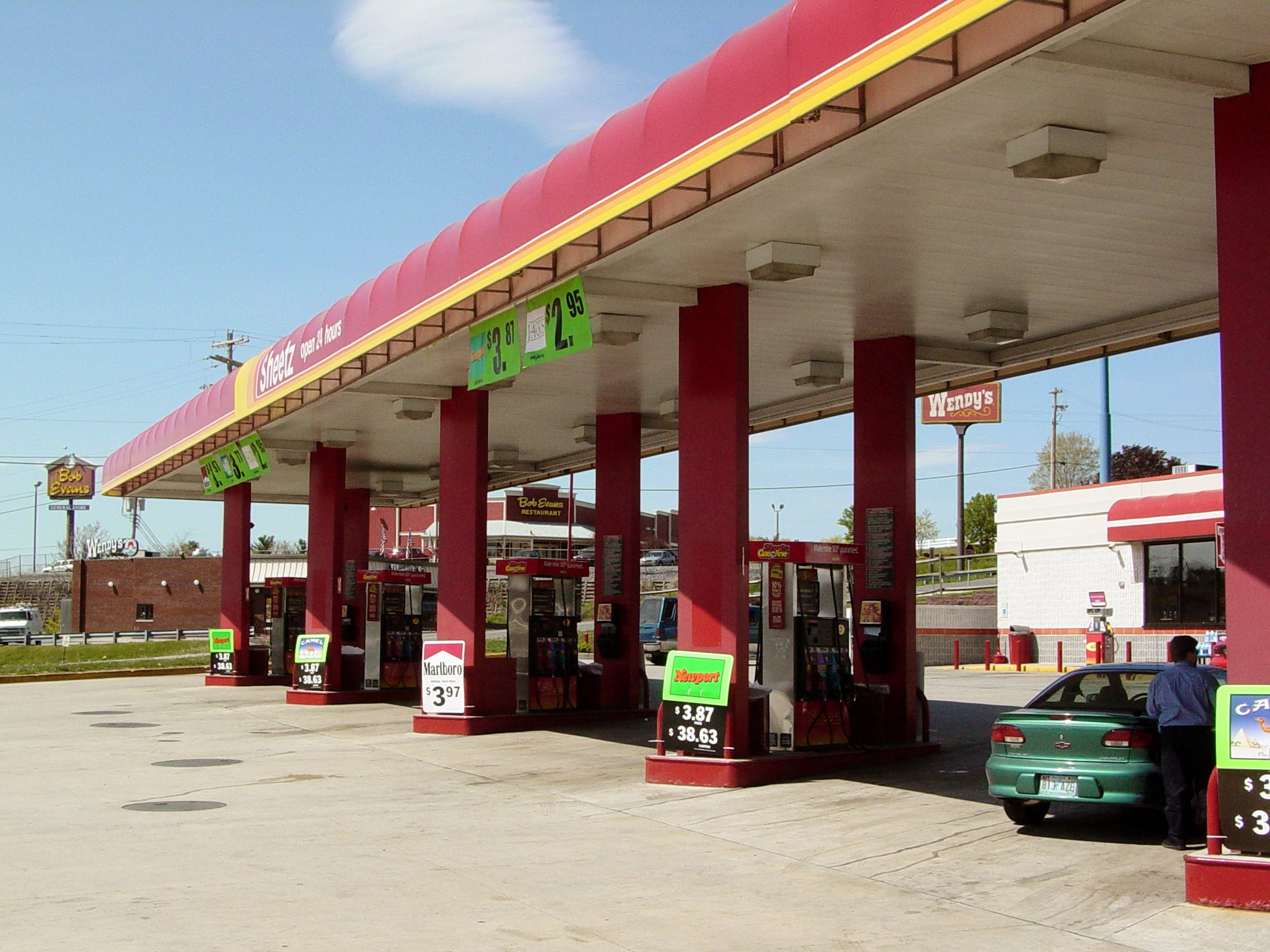
A Sheetz station with several pumps in Breezewood, Pennsylvania, US

In New Jersey, filling stations offer only full service (and mini service); attendants there are required to pump gasoline for customers. Customers, in fact, are prohibited by law from pumping their own gasoline. The only exception to this within New Jersey is at the filling station next to Joint Base McGuire-Dix-Lakehurst in Wrightstown. New Jersey prohibited self-service in 1949, with the passage of "Retail Gasoline Dispensing Safety Act," after lobbying by service station owners. That laws states that "Because of the fire hazards directly associated with dispensing fuel, it is in the public interest that gasoline station operators have the control needed over that activity to ensure compliance with appropriate safety procedures, including turning off vehicle engines and refraining from smoking while fuel is dispensed." Proponents of the prohibition cite safety and jobs as reasons to keep the ban. Of note, the ban does not apply to the pumping of diesel fuel at filling stations (though individual filling stations may prohibit this); nor does it apply to the pumping of gasoline into boats or aircraft.

Oregon prohibited self-service in a 1951 statute prohibiting that listed 17 different justifications, including flammability, the risk of crime from customers leaving their vehicles, toxic fumes, and the jobs created by requiring mini service. In 1982 Oregon voters rejected a ballot measure sponsored by the service station owners, which would have legalized self-service. Oregon legislators passed a bill that was signed into law by the Governor in May 2017 to allow self-service for counties with a total population of 40,000 or less beginning in January 2018. Governor Tina Kotek passed a law allowing for it in 2023, but stations are still required to provide full-serve for customers who want it.

The constitutionality of the self-service bans has been disputed. The Oregon statute was brought into court in 1989 by ARCO, and the New Jersey statute was challenged in court in 1950 by a small independent service station, Rein Motors. Both challenges failed.

The town of Huntington, New York has prohibited self-service stations since the early 1970s firstly to prevent theft and later due to safety concerns.

The towns of Arlington, Massachusetts and Weymouth, Massachusetts have also prohibited self-service stations since 1975 and 1977, respectively.

Contrary to popular belief, lit cigarettes are not capable of igniting gasoline. However, several states outlaw smoking at gas stations as the fire from the ignition source used to light the cigarette can ignite gasoline vapors. Most gas stations and many municipalities will also explicitly ban any smoking activity within certain distances of gasoline pumps.

== Other goods and services commonly available ==
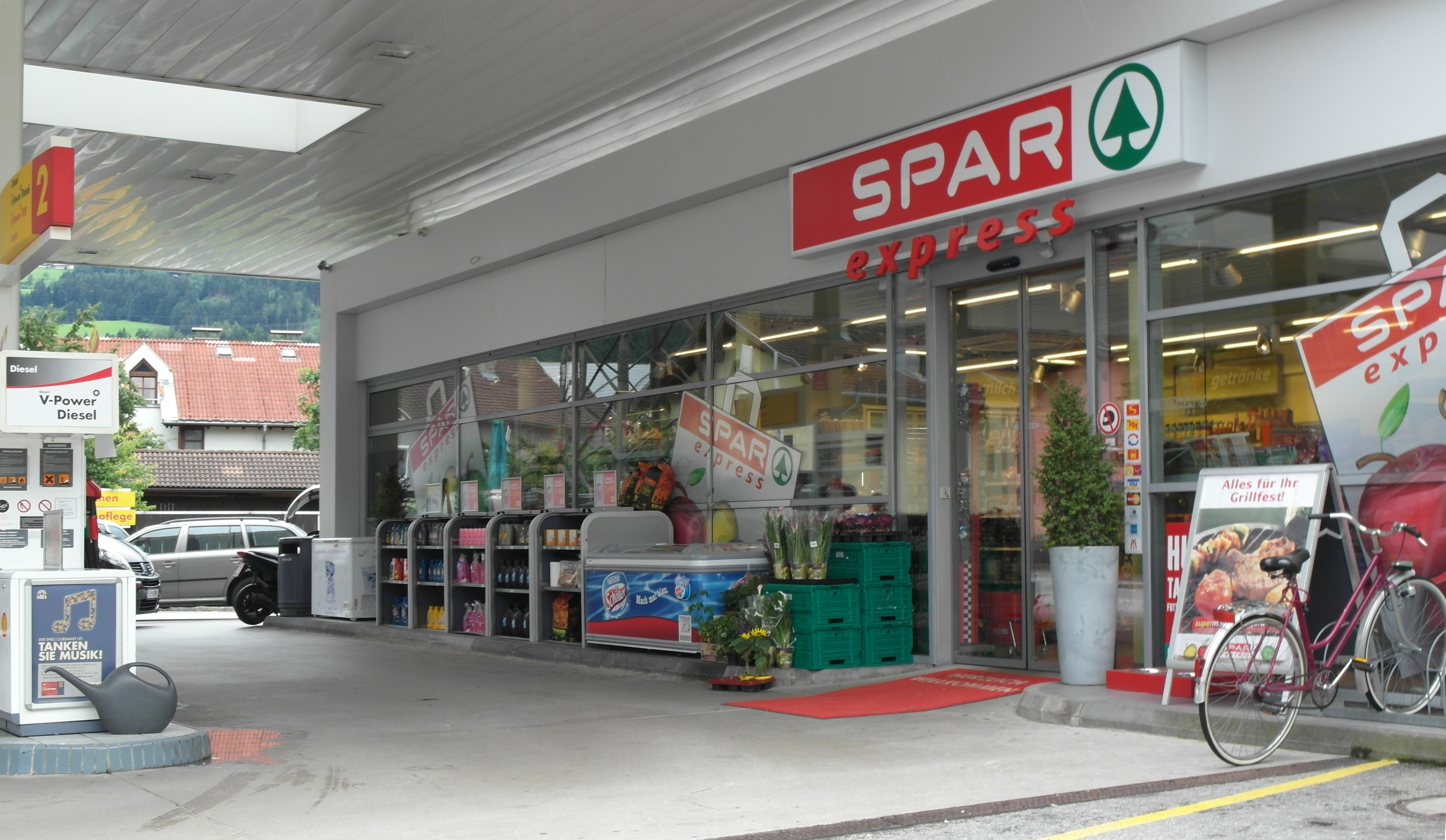
A Spar express convenience store in a Shell station in Wattens, Austria

Many filling stations provide toilet facilities for customer use, as well as squeegees and paper towels for customers to clean their vehicle's windows. Discount stations may not provide these amenities in some countries.

Stations usually have an air compressor, usually with a built-in or provided handheld tire-pressure gauge, to inflate tires and a hose to add water to vehicle radiators. Some air compressor machines are free of charge, while others charge a small fee to use (usually 50 cents to a dollar in North America). In some US states, such as California, state laws require that paying customers must be provided with free air compressor service and radiator water.

In some regions of America and Australia, many filling stations have a mechanic on duty, but this practice has died out in other parts of the world.

Many filling stations have integrated convenience stores which sell food, beverages, and often cigarettes, lottery tickets, motor oil, and auto parts. Prices for these items tend to be higher than they would be at a supermarket or discount store.

Many stations, particularly in the United States, have a fast food outlet inside. These are usually "express" versions with limited seating and limited menus, though some may be regular-sized and have spacious seating. Larger restaurants are common at truck stops and toll road service plazas.

In some US states, beer, wine, and liquor are sold at filling stations, though this practice varies according to state law (see Alcohol laws of the United States by state). Nevada also allows the operation of slot and video poker machines without time restrictions.

Vacuum cleaners, often coin-operated, are a common amenity to allow the cleaning of vehicle interiors, either by the customer or by an attendant.

Some stations are equipped with car washes. Car washes are sometimes offered free of charge or at a discounted price with a certain amount of fuel purchased. Conversely, some car washes operate filling stations to supplement their businesses.

From approximately 1920 to 1980, many service stations in the US provided free road maps affiliated with their parent oil companies to customers. This practice fell out of favor due to the 1970s energy crisis.

== Fuel prices ==
=== Europe ===
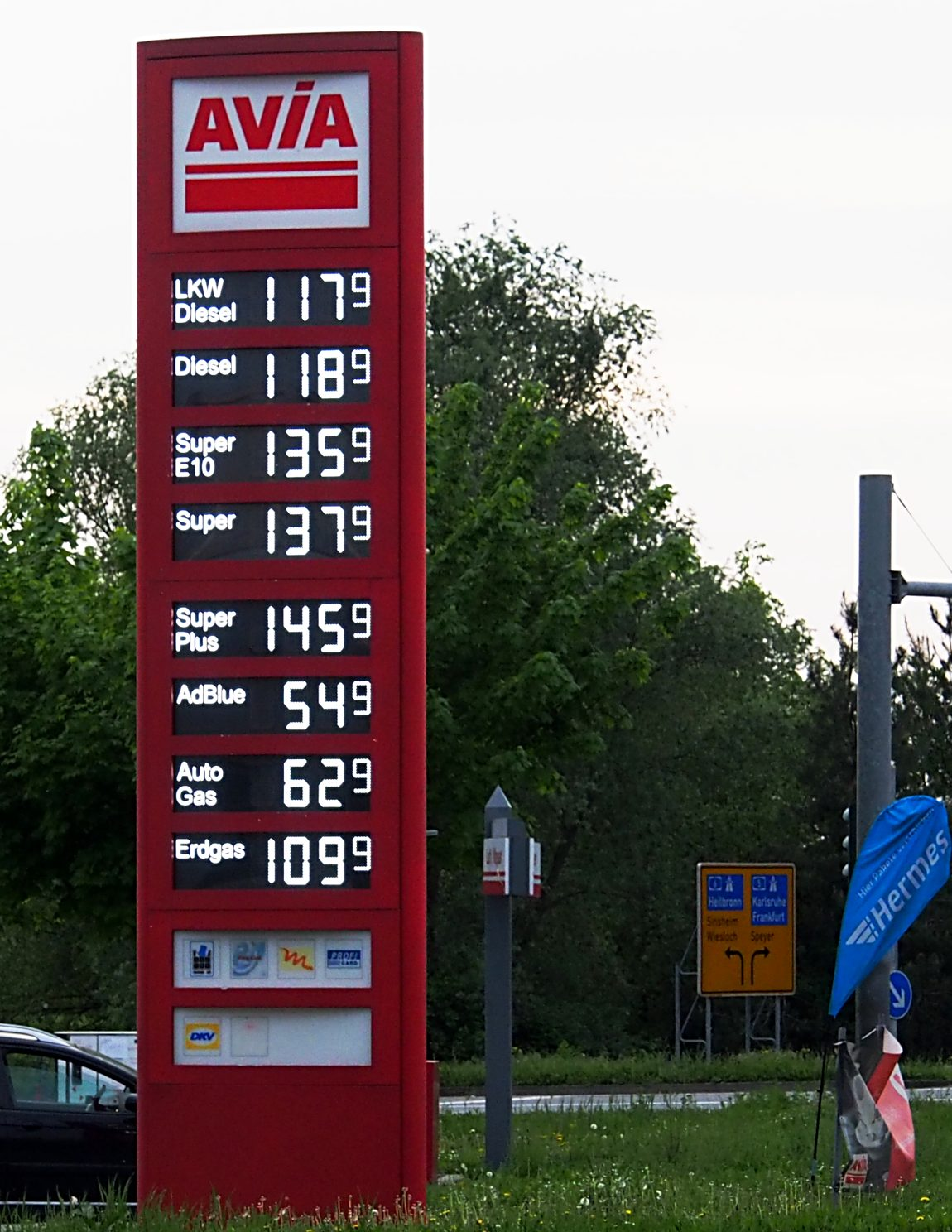
Fuel prices in Germany (cents per liter)

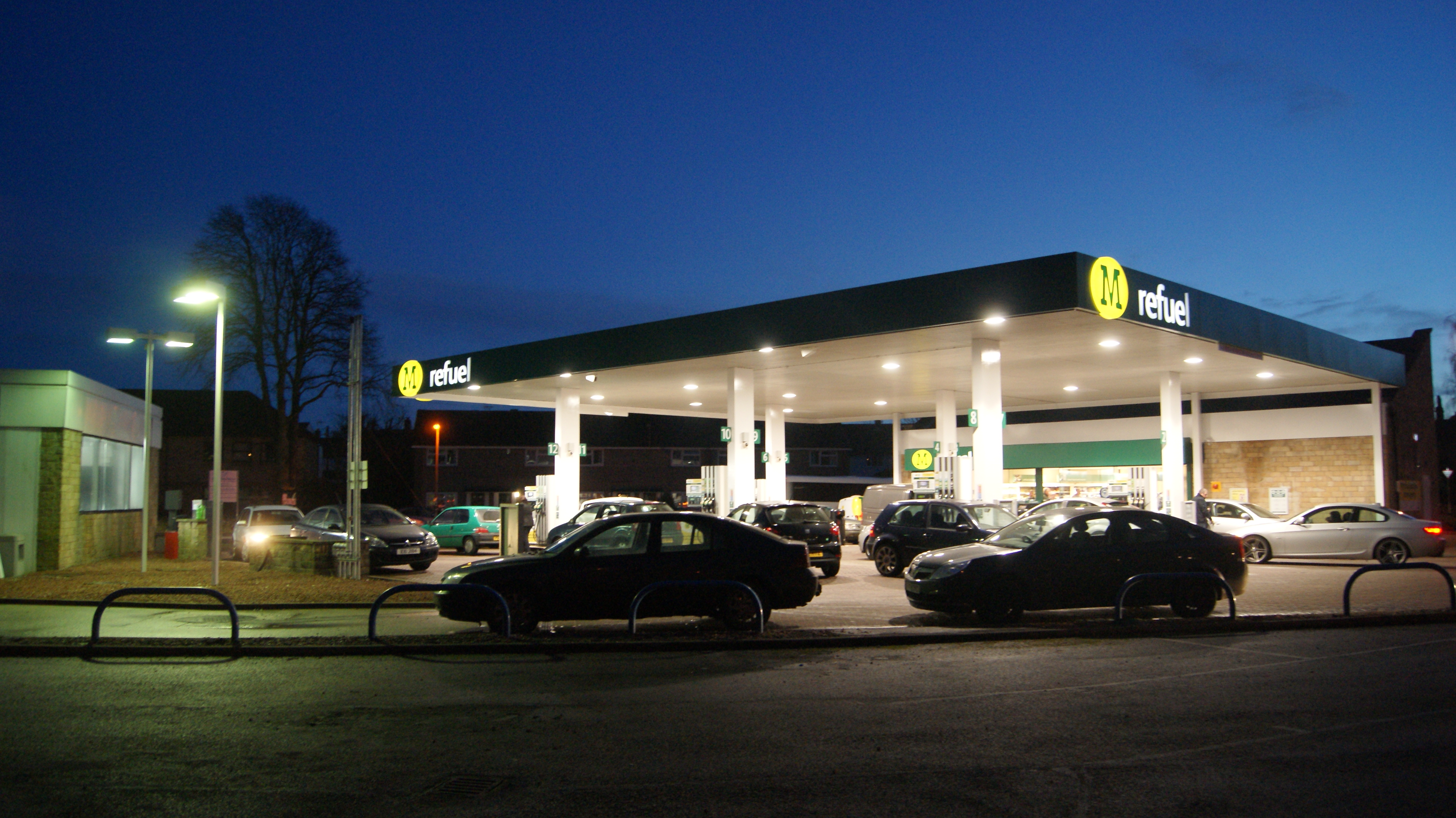
Many supermarkets in Europe have branched into gasoline retailing, as shown by this Morrisons filling station in Wetherby, West Yorkshire, England.

In European Union member states, gasoline prices are much higher than in North America due to higher fuel excise or taxation, although the base price is also higher than in the US. Occasionally, price rises trigger national protests. In the UK, a large-scale protest in August and September 2000, known as 'The Fuel Crisis', caused wide-scale havoc not only across the UK, but also in some other EU countries. The UK Government eventually backed down by indefinitely postponing a planned increase in fuel duty. This was partially reversed during December 2006 when then-Chancellor of the Exchequer Gordon Brown raised fuel duty by 1.25 pence per liter.

National prices representative of gasoline price (Eurosuper 95) on 24 September 2018, as provided by EU member states Legend: < €1.25 /L < < €1.35 /L < < €1.50 /L < Non member state source European Union DG ENER

Since 2007, gasoline prices in the UK rose by nearly 40 pence per liter, going from 97.3 pence per liter in 2007 to 136.8 pence per liter in 2012.

In much of Europe, including the UK, France and Germany, stations operated by large supermarket chains usually price fuel lower than stand-alone stations. In most of mainland Europe, sales tax is lower on diesel fuel than on gasoline, and diesel is accordingly the cheaper fuel: in the UK and Switzerland, diesel has no tax advantage and retails at a higher price by quantity than gasoline (offset by its higher energy yield).

In 2014, according to Eurostat, the mean EU28 price was €1.38 /L for euro-super 95 (gasoline), €1.26 /L for diesel. The least expensive gasoline was in Estonia at €1.10 /L, and the most expensive at €1.57 /L in Italy. The least expensive diesel was in Estonia at €1.14 /L, and the most expensive at €1.54 /L in the UK. The least expensive LPG was in Belgium at €0.50 /L, and the most expensive at €0.83 /L in France.

=== North America ===
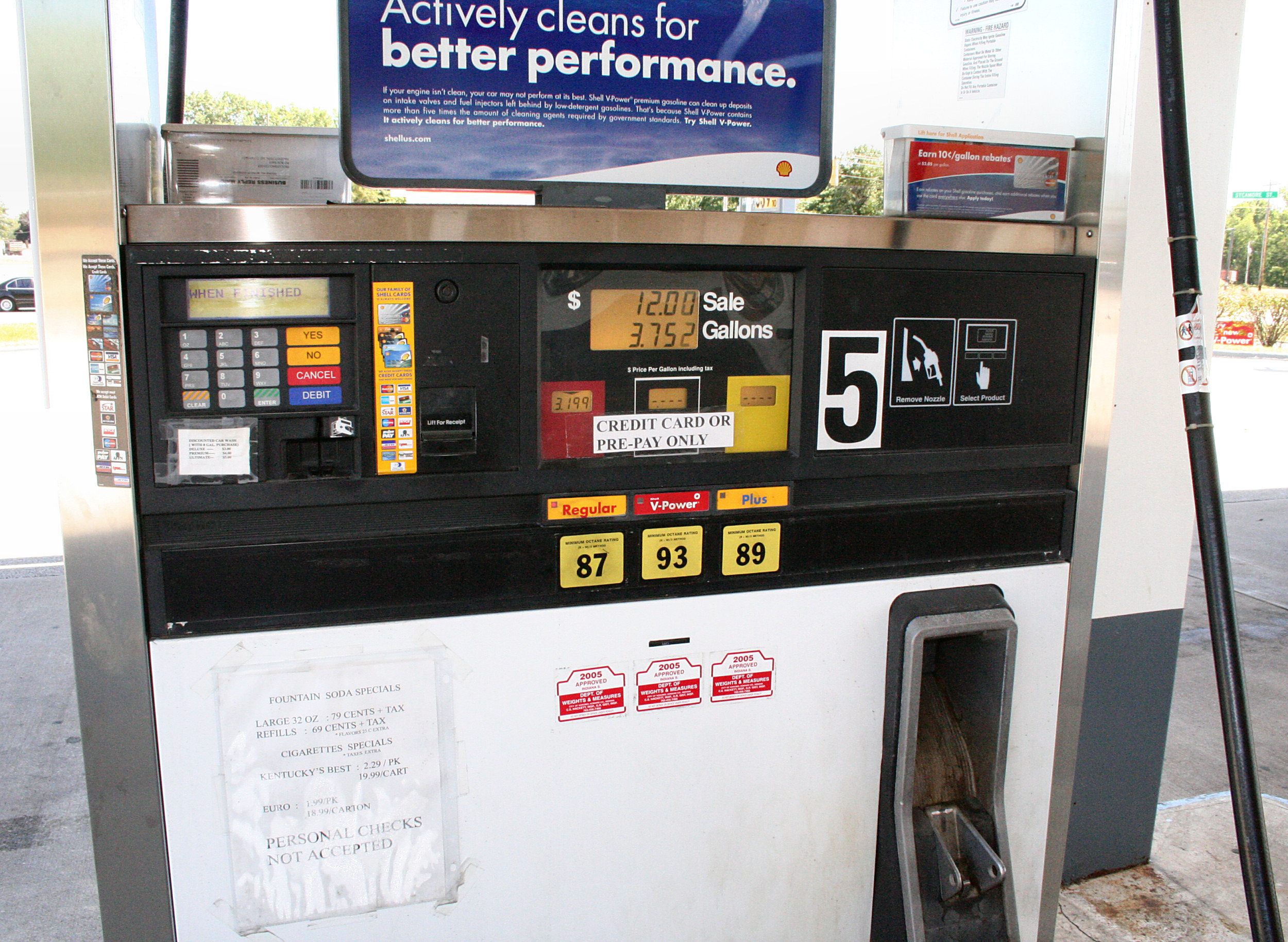
Pay-at-the-pump gasoline pump

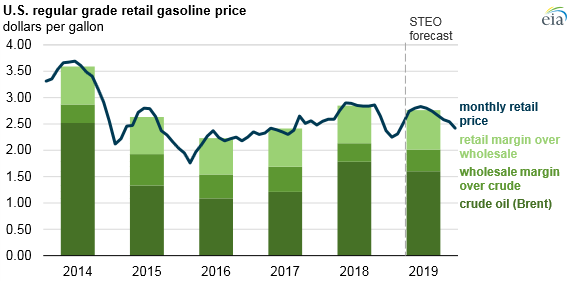
Retail markup over crude oil and wholesale gasoline, 2014–2019

Nearly all filling stations in North America advertise their prices on large signs outside the stations. Some locations have laws requiring such signage.

In Canada and the United States, federal, state or provincial, and local sales taxes are usually included in the price, although tax details are often posted at the pump and some stations may provide details on sales receipts. Gasoline taxes are often ring-fenced (dedicated) to fund transportation projects such as the maintenance of existing roads and the construction of new ones.

Individual filling stations in the United States have little if any control over gasoline prices. The wholesale price of gasoline is determined according to area by oil companies which supply the gasoline, and their prices are largely determined by the world markets for oil. Individual stations are unlikely to sell gasoline at a loss, and the profit margin—typically between 7 and 11 cents a US gallon (2–3 cents per liter)—that they make from gasoline sales is limited by competitive pressures: a gas station which charges more than others will lose customers to them. Most stations try to compensate by selling higher-margin food products in their convenience stores.

Even with oil market fluctuations, prices for gasoline in the United States are among the lowest in the industrialized world; this is principally due to lower taxes. While the sales price of gasoline in Europe is more than twice that in the United States, the price excluding taxes is nearly identical in the two areas. Some Canadians and Mexicans in communities close to the US border drive into the United States to purchase cheaper gasoline.

Due to heavy fluctuations in price in the United States, some stations offer their customers the option to buy and store gasoline for future uses, such as the service provided by First Fuel Bank.

In order to save money, some consumers in Canada and the United States inform each other about low and high prices through the use of gasoline price websites. Such websites allow users to share prices advertised at filling stations with each other by posting them to a central server. Consumers then may check the prices listed in their geographic area in order to select the station with the lowest price available at the time. Some television and radio stations also compile pricing information via viewer and listener reports of pricing or reporter observations and present it as a regular segment of their newscasts, usually before or after traffic reports. These price observations must usually be made by reading the pricing signs outside stations, as many companies do not give their prices by telephone due to competitive concerns. It is a criminal offense to have written or verbal arrangements with competitors, suppliers or customers for:

- Fixing prices and exchanging information on prices or cost (including discounts and rebates),
- Limiting or restraining competition unduly,
- Engaging in misleading or deceptive practices.

Gas stations must never hold discussions with other competitors regarding pricing policies and methods, terms of sale, costs, allocation of markets or boycotts of our petroleum products.

=== Rest of the world ===
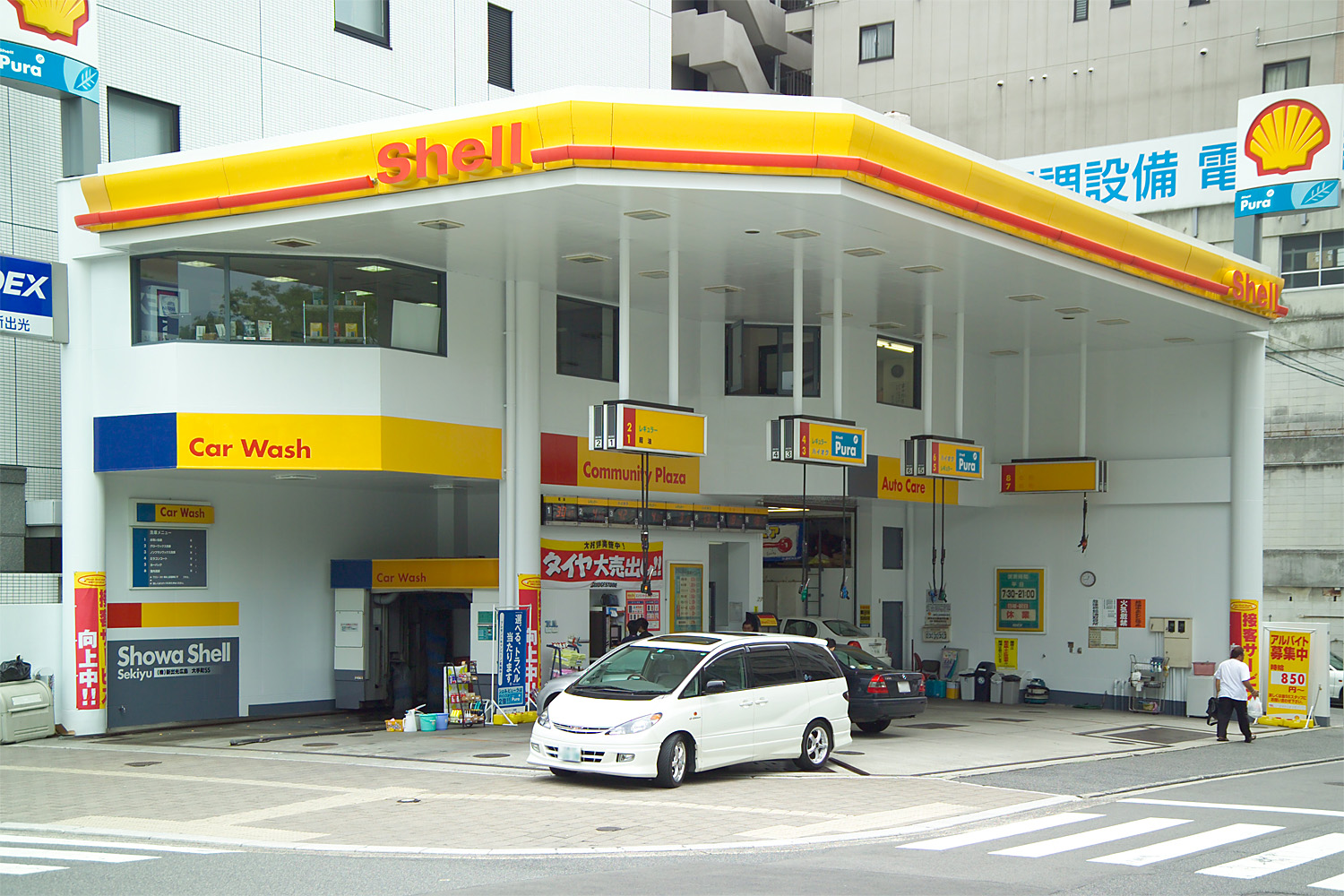
Like many gasoline stands in Japan, this Shell filling station has hoses that hang from above.

In other energy-importing countries such as Japan, gasoline and petroleum product prices are higher than in the United States because of fuel transportation costs and taxes.

On the other hand, some of the major oil-producing countries such as the Gulf states, Iran, Iraq, and Venezuela provide subsidized fuel at well-below world market prices. This practice tends to encourage heavy consumption.

Hong Kong has some of the highest pump prices in the world, but most customers are given discounts as card members.

Singapore, like Hong Kong, also has similarly high pump prices, which are largely based on a pricing strategy called Mean of Platts Singapore (MOPS). As Singapore does not have any oil reserves of its own, the city-state has instead built several off-shore refineries to refine oil imported mostly from Indonesian oil fields, as the latter country does not have enough refining capacity and capability of its own. Because neighbouring country Malaysia has cheaper pump prices than Singapore, cars registered in Singapore crossing over into Malaysia are legally required to have at least three-quarters of a tank of fuel since 1991 to prevent evading fuel duties, and when filling up in Malaysia, Singaporean-and Thai-registered hybrid and petrol-powered vehicles are legally restricted to only fill up on unsubsidised, premium-grade RON97-100 petrol, as RON95 petrol in Malaysia is partially subsidised by the Government of Malaysia for the benefit of lower-income Malaysian residents.

In Western Australia a program called FuelWatch requires most filling stations to notify their "tomorrow prices" by 2 pm each day; prices are changed at 6 am each morning, and must be held for 24 hours. Each afternoon, the prices for the next day are released to the public and the media, allowing consumers to decide when to fill up.

== Service stations ==
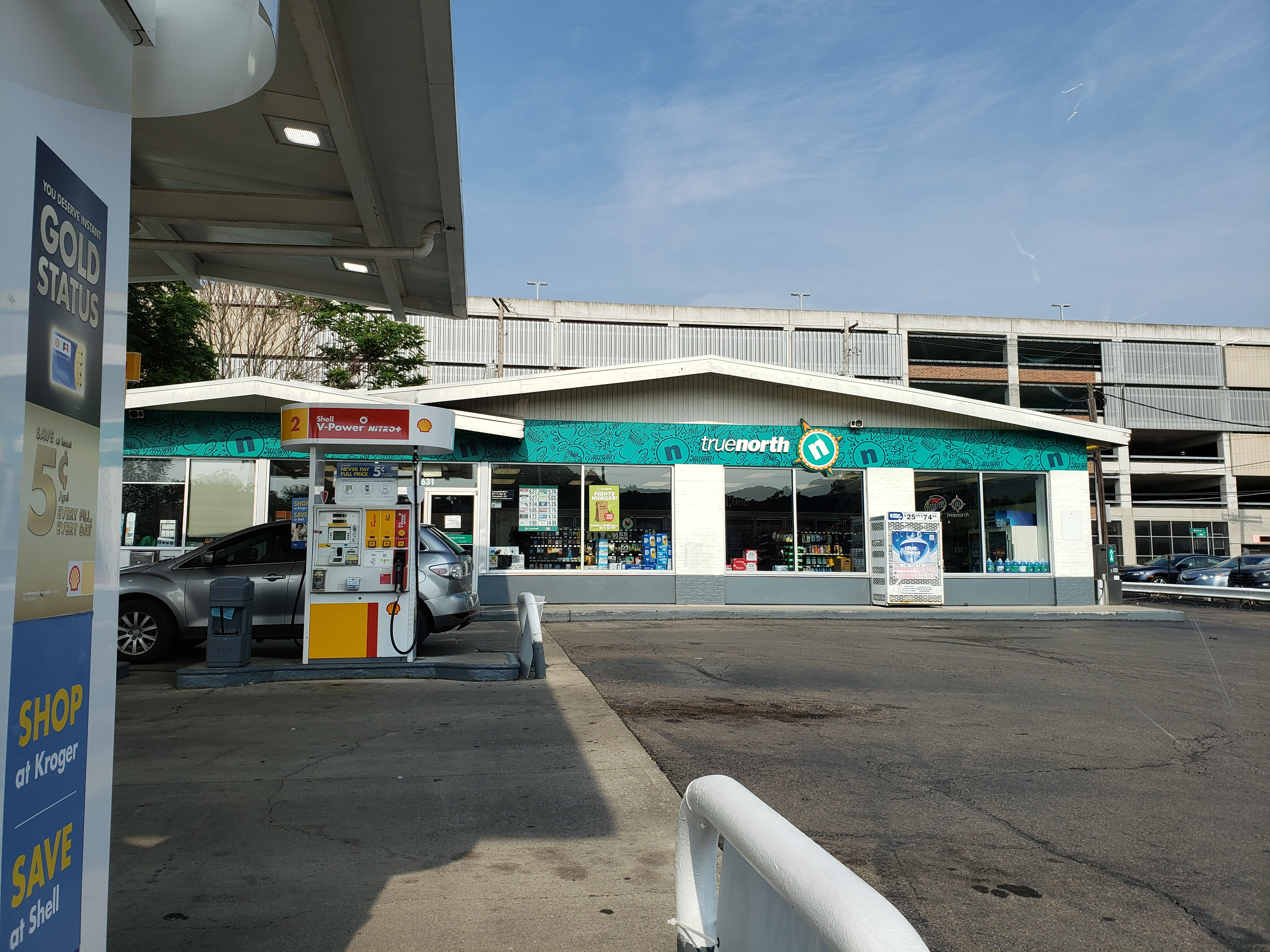
A Shell station in Columbus, Ohio in 2020. The building, which formerly housed a service station, was converted into a convenience store.

A service station or "servo" is the terminology often used in Australia, along with petrol station, to describe any facility where motorists can refuel their cars.

In New Zealand a filling station is often referred to as a service station, petrol station or garage, even though it may not offer mechanical repairs or assistance with dispensing fuel. Levels of service available include full service, for which assistance in dispensing fuel is offered, as well as offers to check tire pressure or clean vehicle windscreens. That type of service is becoming uncommon in New Zealand, particularly Auckland. Further south of Auckland, many filling stations offer full service. There is also help service or assisted service, for which customers must request assistance before it is given, and self-service, for which no assistance is available.

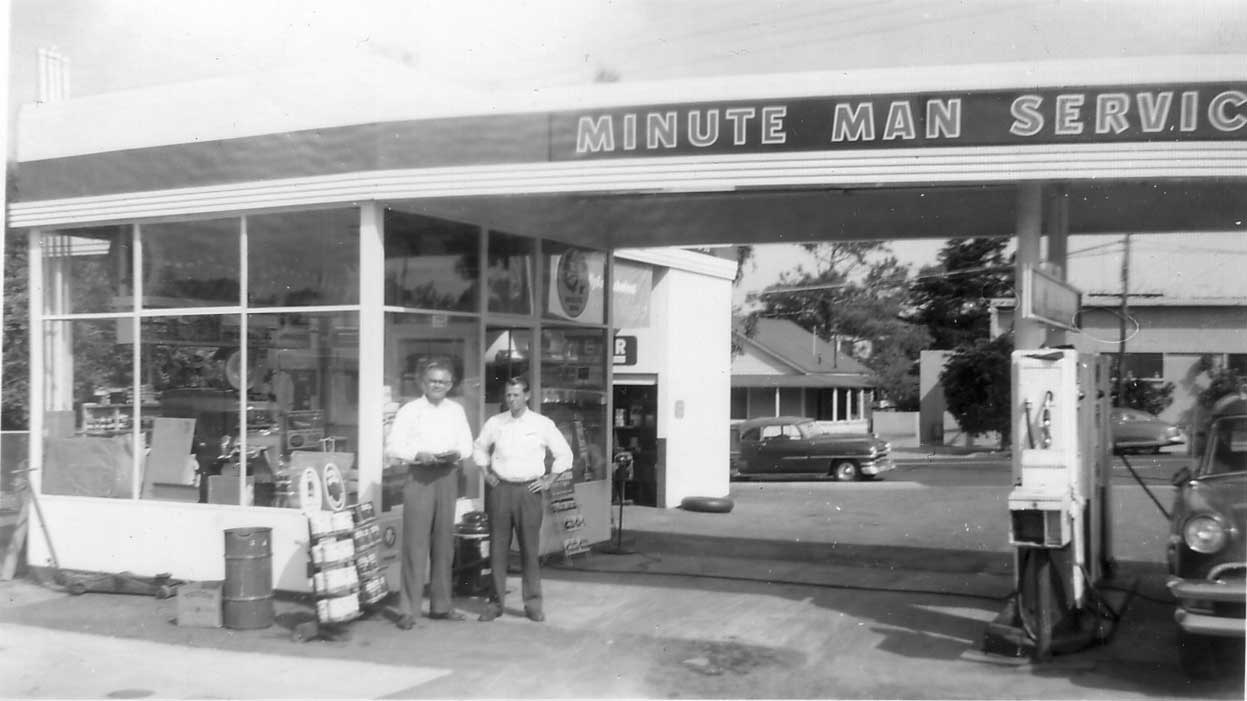
US service station c. 1950s

In the US, a filling station that also offers services such as oil changes and mechanical repairs to automobiles is called a service station. Until the 1970s the vast majority of filling stations were service stations. These stations typically offered free air for inflating tires, as compressed air was already on hand to operate the repair garage's pneumatic tools. While a few filling stations with a service station remain, many in the 1980s and 1990s were converted to convenience stores while still selling fuel, while others continued to offer services but discontinued offering fuel.

This kind of business provided the name for the US comic strip Gasoline Alley, where a number of the characters worked.

In the UK and Ireland, a 'service station' refers to much larger facilities, usually attached to motorways (see rest area) or major truck routes, which provide food outlets, large parking areas, and often other services such as hotels, arcade games, and shops in addition to 24-hour fuel supplies and a higher standard of restrooms. Fuel is typically more expensive from these outlets due to their premium locations. UK or Irish service stations do not usually repair automobiles.

== Highway service centre ==
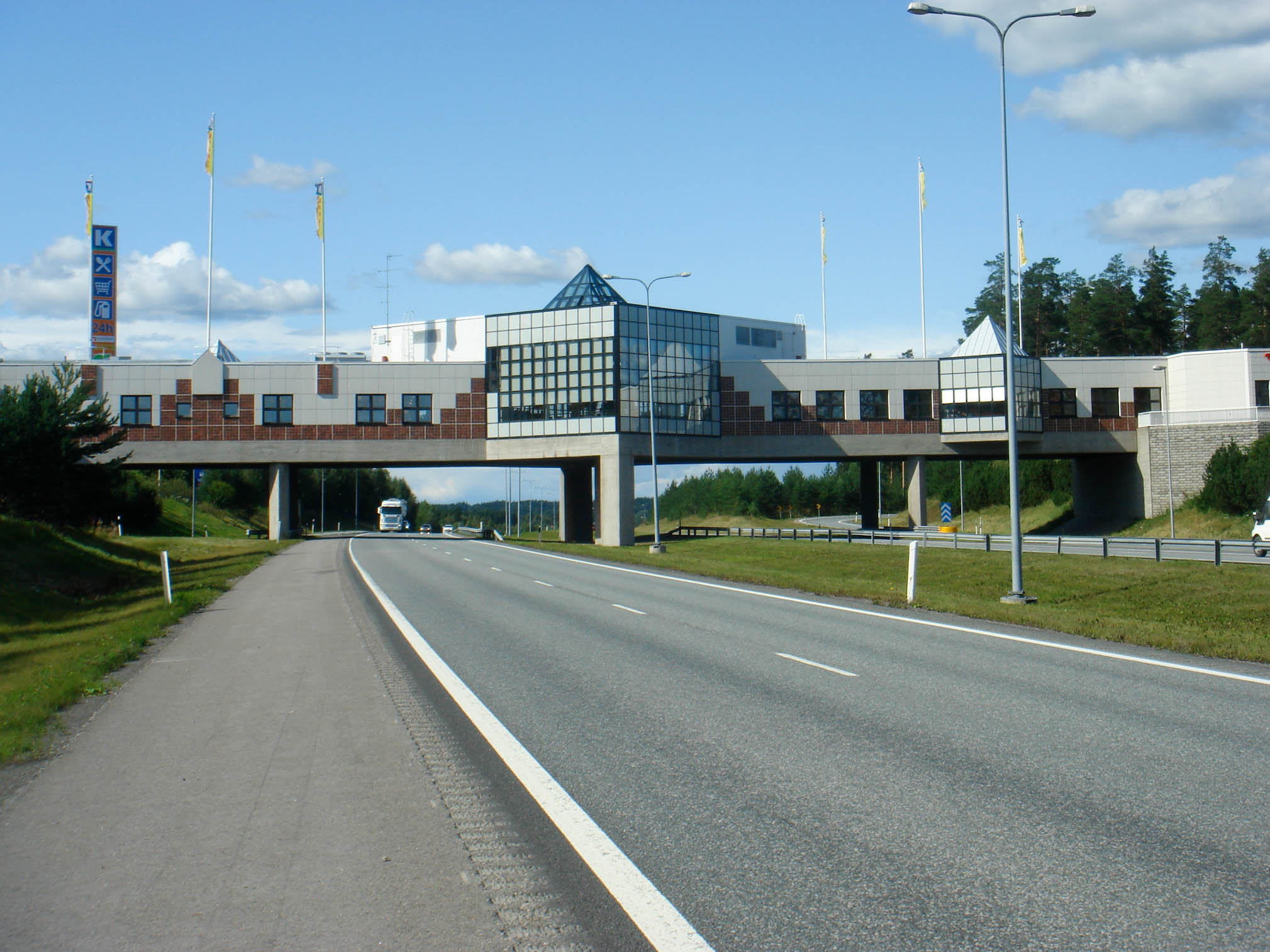
Linnatuuli, a highway service centre in Janakkala, Finland, along the Tampere Highway (E12)

This arrangement occurs on many freeways or motorways including those that are tolled, and are generally referred to as rest areas (UK), services (UK), travel plaza, rest stop, oasis (US), service area, rest and service area (RSA), resto, service plaza, lay-by, service centre). In the United Kingdom and Ireland these are called motorway service areas. In many cases, these centers might have a food court or restaurants. They provide drivers and passengers can rest, eat, or refuel without exiting onto secondary roads.

Often, the state government maintains public rest areas directly connected to freeways, but does not rent out space to private businesses, as this is specifically prohibited by law via the Interstate Highway Act of 1956 which created the national Interstate Highway System, except sites on freeways built before January 1, 1960, and toll highways that are self-supporting but have Interstate designation, under a grandfather clause. As a result, such areas often provide only minimal services such as restrooms and vending machines.

Private entrepreneurs develop additional facilities, such as truck stops or travel centers, restaurants, gas stations, and motels in clusters on private land adjacent to major interchanges. In the US, Pilot Flying J and TravelCenters of America are two of the most common full-service chains of truck stops. Because these facilities are not directly connected to the freeway, they usually have huge signs on poles high enough to be visible by motorists in time to exit from the freeway. Sometimes, the state also posts small official signs (normally blue) indicating what types of filling stations, restaurants, and hotels are available at an upcoming exit; businesses may add their logos to these signs for a fee.

Similar arrangements and facilities to the U.S. exist in much of Canada. Additionally, the province of Ontario has stops along two of its 400-series highways, the 401 and the 400, traditionally referred to as "Service Centres", but rebranded as ONroute beginning in 2010 as part of a full rebuild of most of the sites. Owned by the provincial government, but leased to a private operator, they contain food courts, convenience stores, washrooms, and co-located gas and diesel bars with attached convenience stores. Food providers include Tim Hortons (at all sites), A&W, and Burger King. Fuel sales are contracted to Canadian Tire, but sold under the Petro-Canada brand since 2026.

== Octane ==
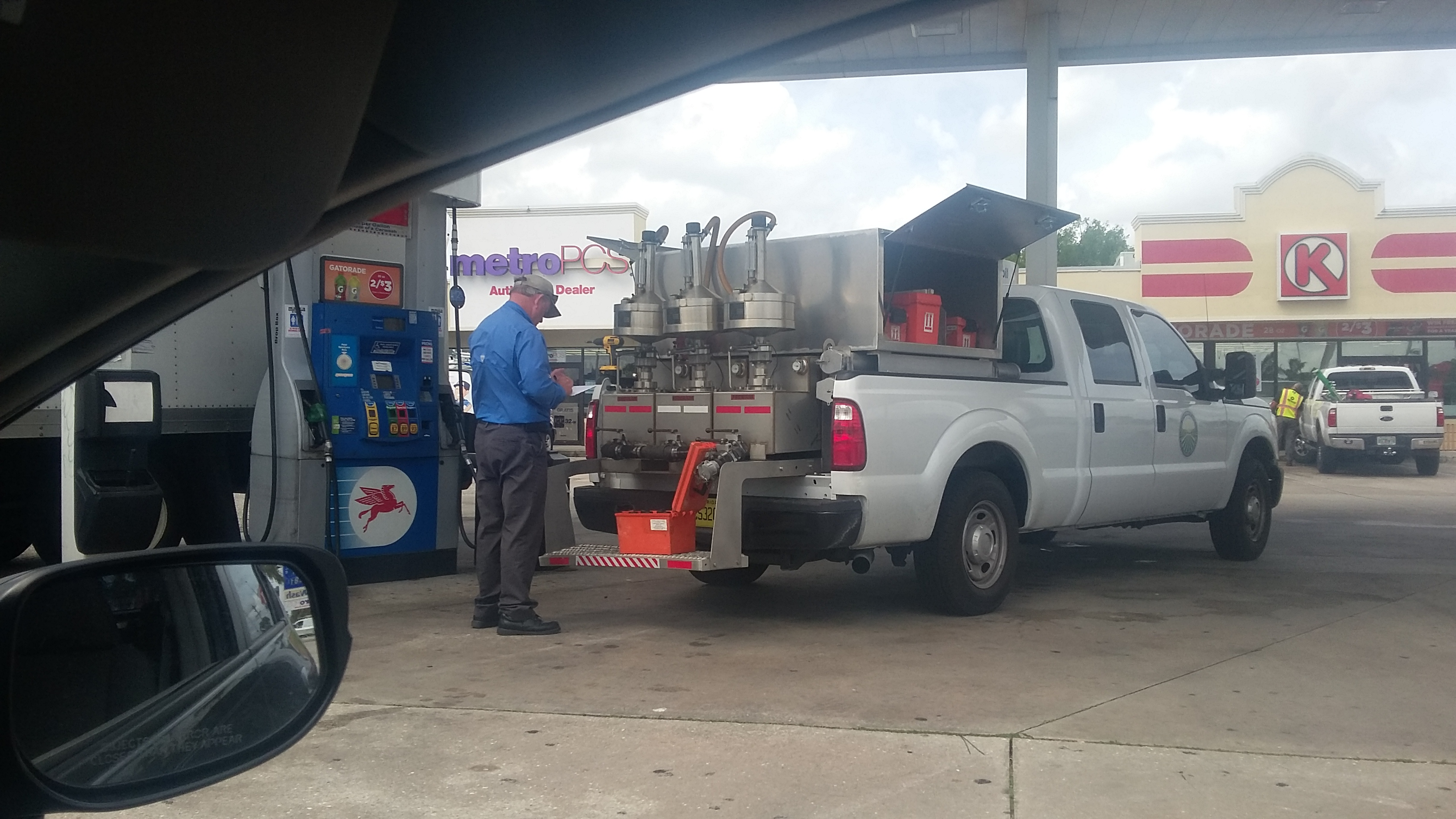
A state petroleum inspector visiting a Mobil station in Port Charlotte, Florida

In Australia, gasoline is unleaded, and available in 91, 95, 98 and 100 octane (names differ from brand to brand). Fuel additives for use in cars designed for leaded fuel are available at most filling stations.

In Canada, the most commonly found octane grades are 87 (regular), 89 (mid grade) and 91 (premium), using the same "(R+M)/2 Method" used in the US (see below).

In China, the most commonly found octane grade is RON 91 (regular), 93 (mid grade) and 97 (premium). Almost all of the fuel has been unleaded since 2000. In some premium filling stations in large cities, such as PetrolChina and Sinopec, RON 98 gas is sold for racing cars.

In Europe, gasoline is unleaded and available in 95 RON (Eurosuper) and, in nearly all countries, 98 RON (Super Plus) octanes; in some countries 91 RON octane gasoline is offered as well. In addition, 100 RON is offered in some countries in continental Europe (Shell markets this as V-Power Racing). Some stations offer 98 RON with lead substitute (often called Lead-Replacement Petrol, or LRP).

In New Zealand, gasoline is unleaded, and most commonly available in two grades: 91 RON ("Regular") and 95 RON ("Premium"). 98 RON is available at selected BP ("Ultimate") and Mobil ("Synergy 8000") service stations instead of the standard 95 RON. 96 RON was replaced by 95 RON, and subsequently abolished in 2006. Leaded fuel was abolished in 1996.

In the UK the most common gasoline grade (and lowest octane generally available) is 'Premium' 95 RON unleaded. 'Super' is widely available at 97 RON (for example Shell V-Power, BP Ultimate). Leaded fuel is no longer available.

In the United States all motor vehicle gasoline is unleaded and is available in several grades with different octane rating; 87 (Regular), 89 (Mid-Grade), and 93 (Premium) are typical grades. At high altitudes in the Mountain States and the Black Hills of South Dakota, regular unleaded can be as low as 85 octane; this practice has become increasingly controversial, since it was instituted when most cars had carburetors instead of the fuel injection and electronic engine controls standard in recent decades.

In the US gasoline is described in terms of its "pump octane", which is the mean of their "RON" (Research Octane Number) and "MON" (Motor Octane Number). Labels on pumps in the US typically describe this as the "(R+M)/2 Method". Some nations describe fuels according to the traditional RON or MON ratings, so octane ratings cannot always be compared with the equivalent US rating by the "(R+M)/2 method".

== Differences in gasoline pumps ==
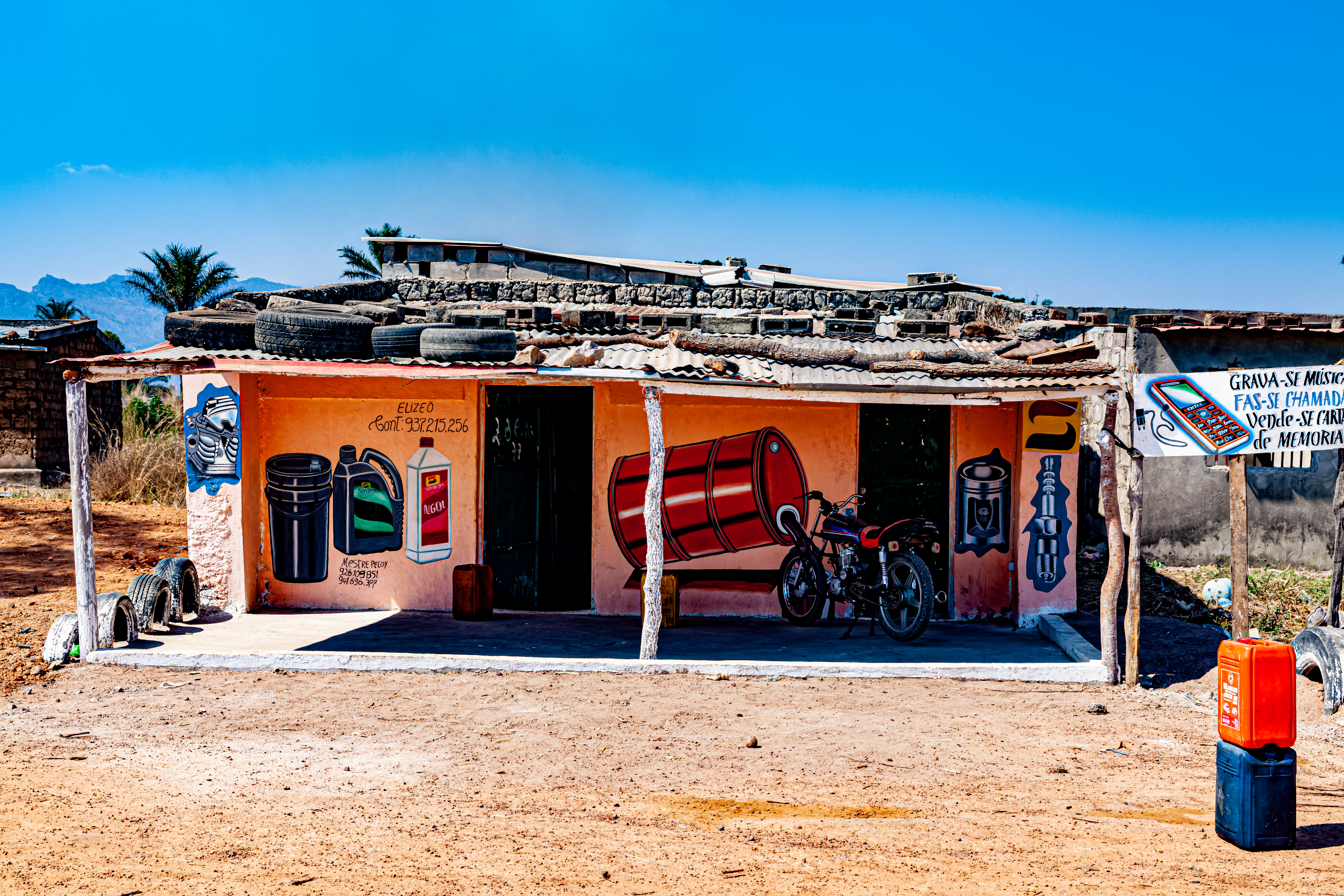
A service station in Angola

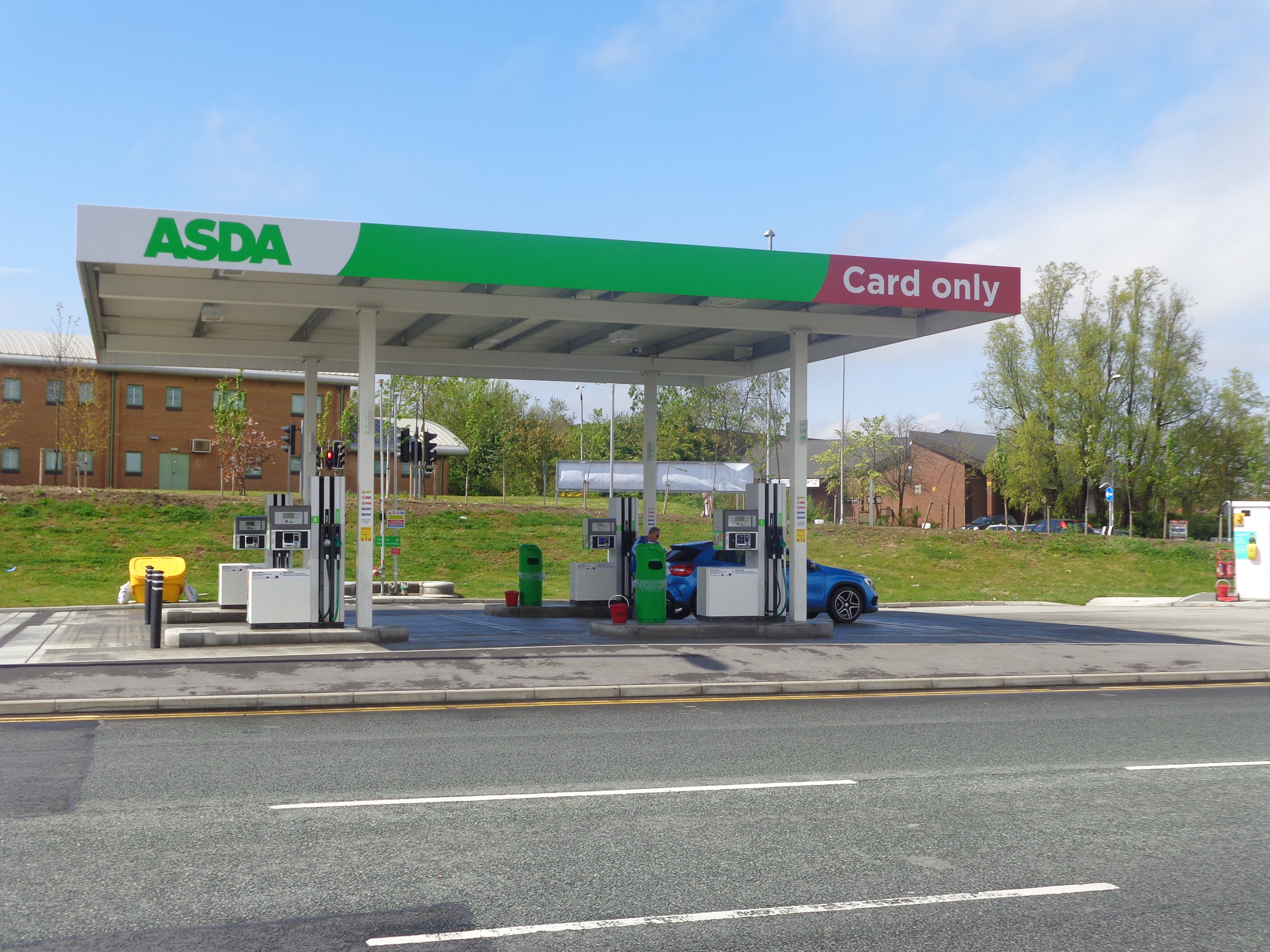
An unstaffed Asda self-service filling station where payment is made at the pump by credit or debit card. This one is in Middleton, Leeds, England.

In Europe, New Zealand and Australia, the customer selects one of several colour-coded nozzles depending on the type of fuel required. The filler pipe of unleaded fuel is smaller than the one for fuels for engines designed to take leaded fuel. The tank filler opening has a corresponding diameter; this prevents inadvertently using leaded fuel in an engine not designed for it, which can damage a catalytic converter. In most stations in Canada and the US, the pump has a single nozzle and the customer selects the desired octane grade by pushing a button. Some pumps require the customer to pick up the nozzle first, then lift a lever underneath it; others are designed so that lifting the nozzle automatically releases a switch. Some newer stations have separate nozzles for different types of fuel. Where diesel fuel is provided, it is usually dispensed from a separate nozzle even if the various grades of gasoline share the same nozzle.

Motorists occasionally pump gasoline into a diesel car by accident. The converse is almost impossible because diesel pumps have a large nozzle with a diameter of 15/16 inch (23.8 mm) which does not fit the 13/16-inch (20.6 mm) filler, and the nozzles are protected by a lock mechanism or a liftable flap. Diesel fuel in a gasoline engine—while creating large amounts of smoke—does not normally cause permanent damage if it is drained once the mistake is realized. However, even a liter of gasoline added to the tank of a modern diesel car can cause irreversible damage to the injection pump and other components through a lack of lubrication. In some cases, the car has to be scrapped because the cost of repairs exceeds its residual value. The issue is not clear-cut as older diesels using completely mechanical injection can tolerate some gasoline—which has historically been used to "thin" diesel fuel in winter.

== Legislation ==
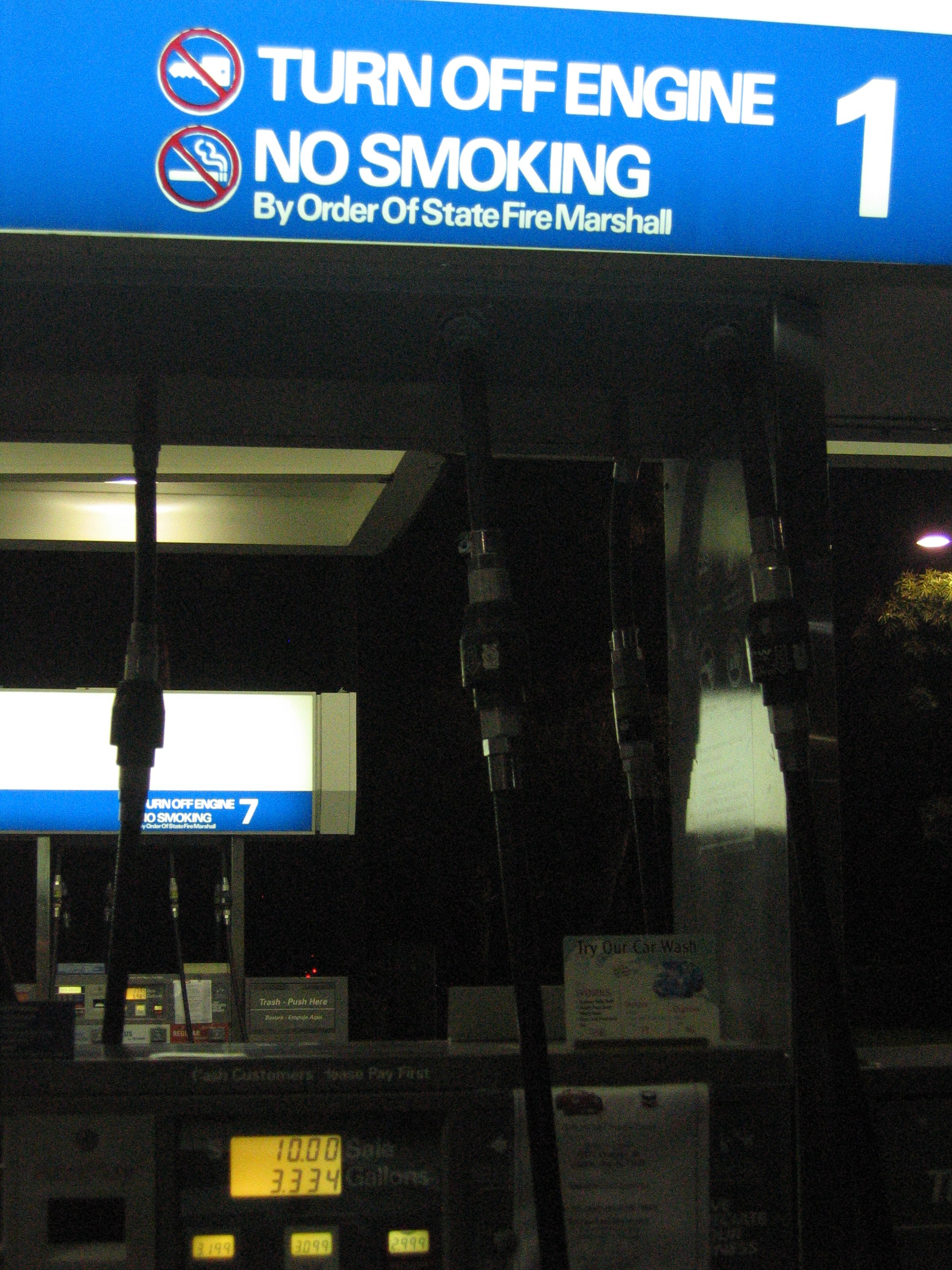
A no smoking sign at a filling station

In most countries, stations are subjected to guidelines and regulations which exist to minimize the potential of fires, and increase safety.

It is prohibited to use open flames on the forecourt of a filling station because of the risk of igniting gasoline vapor. In the United States, establishing fire codes and enforcing their compliance is the responsibility of state governments. Most localities ban smoking, open flames and running engines. Since the increased occurrence of static-related fires many stations have warnings about leaving the refueling point.

Cars can build up static charge by driving on dry road surfaces. However many tire compounds contain enough carbon black to provide an electrical ground which prevents charge build-up. Newer "high mileage" tires use more silica and can increase the buildup of static. A driver who does not discharge static by contacting a conductive part of the car will carry it to the insulated handle of the nozzle and the static potential will eventually be discharged when this purposely-grounded arrangement is put into contact with the metallic filler neck of the vehicle. Ordinarily, vapor concentrations in the area of this filling operation are below the lower explosive limit (LEL) of the product being dispensed, so the static discharge causes no problem. The problem with ungrounded gasoline cans results from a combination of vehicular static charge, the potential between the container and the vehicle, and the loose fit between the grounded nozzle and the gas can. This last condition causes a rich vapor concentration in the ullage (the unfilled volume) of the gas can, and a discharge from the can to the grounded hanging hardware (the nozzle, hose, swivels and break-a-ways) can thus occur at a most inopportune point. The Petroleum Equipment Institute has recorded incidents of static-related ignition at refueling sites since early 2000.

Although urban legends persist that using a mobile phone while pumping gasoline can cause sparks or explosion, this has not been duplicated under any controlled condition. Nevertheless, mobile phone manufacturers and gas stations ask users to switch off their phones. One suggested origin of this myth is said to have been started by gas station companies because the cell phone signal would interfere with the fuel counter on some older model fuel pumps causing it to give a lower reading. In the MythBusters episode "Cell Phone Destruction", investigators concluded that explosions attributed to cell phones could be caused by static discharges from clothing instead and also observed that such incidents seem to involve women more often than men.

The US National Fire Protection Association does most of the research and code writing to address the potential for explosions of gasoline vapor. The customer fueling area, up to 18 inches (46 cm) above the surface, normally does not have explosive concentrations of vapors, but may from time to time. Above this height, where most fuel filler necks are located, there is no expectation of an explosive concentration of gasoline vapor in normal operating conditions. Electrical equipment in the fueling area may be specially certified for use around gasoline vapors.

== Worldwide numbers ==
- The UK has 8,385 filling stations As of 2019, down from about 18,000 in 1992 and a peak of around 40,000 in the mid-1960s.
- The US had 114,474 stations in 2012, according to the US Census Bureau, down from 118,756 in 2007 and 121,446 in 2002.
- In Canada, the number is on the decline. As of December 2008, 12,684 were in operation, significantly down from about 20,000 stations recorded in 1989.
- In Japan, the number dropped from a peak of 60,421 in 1994 to 40,357 at the end of 2009.
- In Germany, the number dropped down to 14,300 in 2011.
- In China, according to different reports, the total number of gas/oil stations (at the end of 2018) is about 106,000.
- India—60,799 (as of November 2017)
- Russia—there were about 25,000 stations in the Russian Federation (2011)
- In Argentina, as of 2021, there are more than 5,000 stations.

=== The largest filling station networks in Europe (2017) ===
- TotalEnergies—8,200 stations
- Shell—7,800 stations
- BP—7,000 stations
- Esso—6,100 stations
- Eni—5,500 stations
- Repsol—4,700 stations
- Q8—4,600 stations
- Avia—3,000 stations
- PKN Orlen—2,800 stations
- Circle K—2,700 stations

== See also ==
- Autogas (LPG)
- Automated fueling
- Biofuels
- Convenience store
- Ethanol
- Filling station attendant
- Gas pump
- Gasoline usage and pricing
- Gasoline
- Highway oasis
- Hydrogen station
- List of automotive fuel retailers
- LPG tank connections
- National Association of Convenience Stores
- Petroleum
- Propellant depot (a gas station in space)
- Road trip
