= U-Cont =

Finnish manufacturing company

Oy U-Cont Ltd
- Industry: Manufacturing
- Founded: 1966 in Pieksämäki, Finland
- Headquarters: Joroinen, Finland
- Area served: Multiple countries, including the United States, Mongolia, northern Russia and Antarctica
- Products: Filling stations, tanks and containers, energy production systems
- Brands: Muurikka (until 2000)
- Services: Consulting, research and development, design

Oy U-Cont Ltd is a Finnish manufacturing company, established in 1966. U-Cont presently produces mainly filling stations, tanks and energy production systems. The company has installed filling stations and tanks in many countries including the United States, Mongolia, northern Russia and Antarctica.

== Products ==
=== Filling stations ===
U-Cont is the developer and manufacturer of underground modular filling stations and a supplier to several countries in northern Europe. ISO 9001 certified U-Cont Filling stations are suitable for groundwater areas. The stations can be moved following installation. U-Cont produces mini-stations, different filling points for heavy-duty traffic, AdBlue –stations, filling stations for boats and multi-islet service stations, both as U-Cont module stations and traditional solutions.

=== Tanks and containers ===
Cont manufactures EN standard-compliant vertical and horizontal tanks to be situated under and above ground in volumes ranging from 5 to 100m³. The tanks and containers can be customized because of their modular structure and by furnishing the tanks with, for example, special accessories and painting requirements. U-Cont has manufactured containers for different uses, including tanks for bitumen with heating units, flammable liquid storage tanks, water tanks, waste oil tanks, pressure tanks, process tanks and storage tanks for waste.

=== Energy production systems ===
Since 2008 U-Cont has supplied energy production systems. In these operations, U-Cont is the system supplier. This includes research and development, design, organization and management of the project to production of the main components and installation. U-Cont has produced energy production systems including bio-ethanol production plants, boiler plants and refineries.

=== Services and consulting ===
U-Cont also offers consulting and other services, such as research and development and designing. In 2010 the company led a development project for Norwegian YX Energi's filling station concept. The project was the largest deal in the company's history, and was also one of the biggest filling station deliveries ever made in Northern Europe, consisting of about one hundred filling stations.

== History ==
U-Cont was established in 1966, as a small workshop in Pieksämäki, Finland. In the beginning e company was run by two men. They obtained their livelihood from variety of things, such as repairing machines and railway carriages, manufacturing tanks and producing sauna stoves. The company moved to Joroinen in 1979 and in the beginning of the 1980s the company created a product that became its most successful so far: the Muurikka frying pan. The pans sold widely in Finland. The Muurikka pans were made from steel that was left over from producing tanks. The company’s other best-selling product in the 1980s was the Sipako fuel tank, which was exported for instance to the Soviet Union.

In the beginning of the 1990s the U-Cont system for filling stations, modular filling station, was developed. The stations were built in modules, in order to reduce installation time. Later subsidiaries for Oy U-Cont Ltd were founded, one in Russia and one in Poland. In the year 2000, Muurikka separated from U-Cont. Lately the focus in U-Cont has been on renewable resources, which has led the company to collaboration with St1 Biofuels and producing bio-ethanol production plants that use baking industry's waste in the process of ethanol production.
