= Automated fueling =

Automated fueling or robotic fueling involves the use of automation to remove human labor from the fueling process. The fueling is performed by a robotic arm, which opens the car's flap, unscrews the cap, picks up the fuel nozzle and inserts it into the tank opening. It requires the contours and dimensions of the fuel cap to be present in the database.

== Timeline ==
- 1963 – The first patents were issued to Charles Mays and Lee Darwin.
- April 1997 – Shell's Smart Pump is introduced to a filling station located at Sacramento, California.
- February 2008 – TankPitStop is introduced to a filling station located at the Netherlands.
- 2013 - Husky and Fuelmatics demonstrated a robotic gas pumps that automatically fill your vehicle when you pull up. This automated system is claimed to reduce pump times by up to 30 percent,
- August 2015 - Tesla Motors showcased a multi-segmented robotic arm that perfectly connects the charging point of an electric car.
