= UPG (gas station chain) =

Ukrainian gas station chain

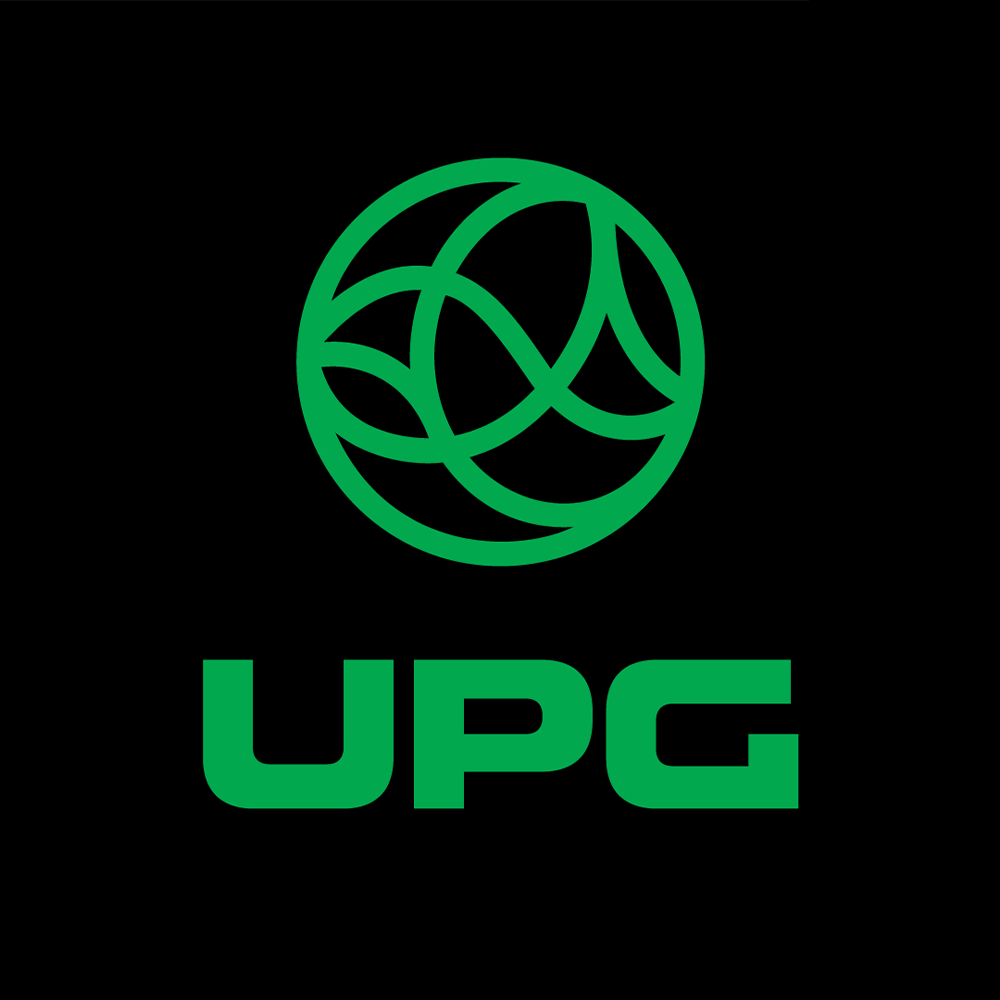
- Type: Private
- Industry: Gas and oil (filling stations)
- Founded: 2003
- Headquarters: Ukraine (21 oblasts)
- Number of locations: More than 500 filling stations
- Key people: Volodymyr Petrenko
- Number of employees: Over 6,000 (2025)
- Parent: Private Enterprise "Ukrpaletsystem"
- Website: upg.ua

UPG (Ukrainian Petroleum Group) is a Ukrainian network of gas stations operating across 21 oblasts of Ukraine. It manages over 500 fueling facilities, including 66 integrated fueling and recreation complexes. The company ranks among the top three largest petroleum market operators in Ukraine by the number of active stations and total fuel sales volume. The brand is operated by the Korosten-based Private Enterprise "Ukrpaletsystem".

== History ==
The company was founded in 2003 by businessman Volodymyr Petrenko in Korosten, Zhytomyr Oblast, under the name "Ukrpaletsystem." In its early years, the venture focused exclusively on wood processing, manufacturing wooden pallets for export to the European Union market.. By 2007, the company expanded its operations into liquid fuel retail, launching its first commercial gas station under the UPG brand

To streamline its retail services, UPG introduced the "UPGgood" national customer loyalty program in 2012, followed by the launch of its "VIVO café" roadside restaurant chain in 2015 to standardize its on-site catering infrastructure. The company established its retail presence in the capital city of Kyiv in 2019. In response to the logistics crises of 2022, UPG completely restructured its supply chain to source certified petroleum products exclusively from the EU and broader global markets. To secure these transit routes, UPG acquired the Polish company Baltchem SA Zakłady Chemiczne in late 2022, gaining operational control over a major marine terminal in Świnoujście capable of handling up to 300,000 tons of fuel monthly, alongside a river terminal in Szczecin with a monthly capacity of 250,000 tons. By 2023, UPG expanded its import portfolio by becoming the first operator to bring United States-manufactured diesel fuel into the Ukrainian domestic market, followed shortly by fuel deliveries sourced from Kuwait's Mina Abdullah Refinery. The company also joined the Ukrainian Oil and Gas Association and opened its largest ultra-modern fueling facility in Hlybochytsia that same year. Diversifying its retail offerings, the network launched its private-label ice cream brand, "iceU," within its restaurant locations in mid-2023.

In 2025, UPG underwent massive network expansion after securing regulatory approval from the Anti-Monopoly Committee of Ukraine to lease 447 retail stations previously operating under the "Privat Group" banners, ANP and Avias.[16] This acquisition grew UPG's total footprint to 529 active stations nationwide. The first wave of 34 rebranded stations rolled out in Kyiv and the surrounding oblast in September 2025, and by January 2026, UPG finalized the operational relaunch of the first 100 acquired complexes across 13 Ukrainian regions.

== Corporate social responsibility ==
In 2022, UPG introduced its "Energy of Good" (Енергія добра) charitable program, pooling a portion of profits from hot beverage purchases across its network to provide humanitarian aid to civilians affected by the war.

In August 2025, UPG entered a strategic partnership with the Superhumans Center, a specialized military trauma and rehabilitation hospital. UPG covers the fuel demands for medical transport teams evacuating wounded individuals from front-line zones. Between April and July 2025, UPG partnered with animal welfare charity UAnimals, backing evacuation initiatives that extracted over 420 displaced or injured animals from front-line areas in the Donetsk, Zaporizhzhia, Kharkiv, Dnipropetrovsk, and Sumy oblasts.

In 2025, the company sponsored the "Limitless" expedition, supporting amputee veterans from the Main Directorate of Intelligence (GUR) during a trek to the Mount Everest Base Camp. The expedition aimed to raise 3 million UAH for phantom limb pain treatment systems.

== Operations ==
UPG operates a self-contained logistics infrastructure, featuring one of the largest private fuel tanker truck fleets in Ukraine. The company also utilizes its own fleet of railway tank cars for domestic fuel transportation.

In early 2023, UPG acquired its own European storage assets, controlling maritime, river, and land terminals to handle and store petroleum products before cross-border transit into Ukraine. The company covers both wholesale and retail distribution of light petroleum products through its standardized filling complexes.

== Recognition ==
- 2021 – Listed among the "100 Largest Private Companies in Ukraine" by Forbes Ukraine.
- 2024 – Recognized as an official "Business Champion" by Forbes Ukraine.
- 2025 – Awarded "Best Coffee Gas Station 2025" at the industry "Gas Station of the Year" awards.
- 2025 – Ranked 22nd in the comprehensive "202 Largest Private Companies in Ukraine" index published by Forbes.
- 2025 – Named the single largest private employer within the Zhytomyr Oblast by data provider OpenDataBot.
- 2025 – Company founder Volodymyr Petrenko was nominated for the prestigious "Entrepreneur of the Year 2025" accolade by Forbes Ukraine.
