= San-Ai Oil =

Japanese company

- Company type: Corporation
- Founded: 1952
- Headquarters: Shinagawa, Tokyo, Japan
- Key people: Jun Kaneda; Yukio Tzukahara; Hirotake Iwata; Yoshihiro Magori; Soichi Kadotani
- Website: www.san-ai-oil.co.jp

San-Ai Oil Co., Ltd. (三愛石油株式会社, San-Ai Sekiyu Kabushiki-gaisha) (TYO: 8097), branded as San-Ai Obbli, is a Japanese company dealing in petroleum products, aviation fuel storage and related services. Established in 1952, San-Ai has a market capitalization of 72.91 billion yen. It is a member of the Ricoh San-Ai Group. Its headquarters are in Shinagawa, Tokyo.

In December 2004, San-Ai purchased Kygnus Oil from TonenGeneral Sekiyu and Nichimo, which each owned 50% of Kygnus.
