= Alberta Ferretti =

Italian fashion designer (born 1950)

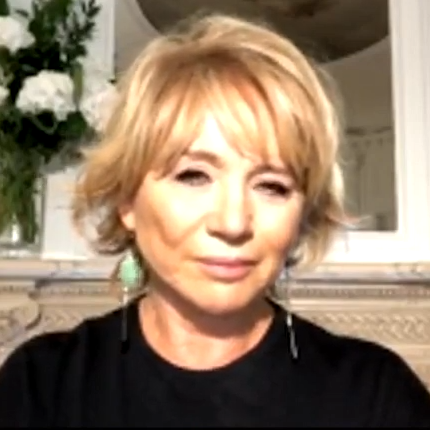
- Ferretti in 2021
- Born: 2 May 1950 (age 76); Gradara, Italy

Alberta Ferretti (Italian pronunciation: [alˈbɛrta ferˈretti]; born 2 May 1950) is an Italian fashion designer and dressmaker. She designed for her namesake brand Alberta Ferretti from its foundation in 1981 to 2024, and designed for Philosophy di Alberta Ferretti until 2014. Her showroom is in Milan, Italy but her studio is in her native village of Cattolica, near Rimini, Italy.

== Aeffe ==
Together with her brother Massimo, Ferretti co-founded Aeffe, a publicly traded clothing manufacturer and distributor based in San Giovanni in Marignano, in 1976. From 1994, Ferretti extended the breadth of her company outside of Italy beginning with the acquisition of a building at 30 West 56th Street in New York City. She also started Aeffe U.S.A., which produced and distributed clothing by Moschino, Rifat Ozbek, Jean Paul Gaultier, and Narcisco Rodriguez. The locale also became the hub for marketing her own collections.

From 2000 to 2006, Sanpaolo IMI – through Nuova Holding Subalpina – held a 20 percent share in Aeffe; it had purchased that share for $44.5 million.

In the early 2000s, Aeffe held a 50 percent stake in the Narciso Rodriguez fashion house.

=== Licensing ===
Under several agreements, the company has been holding licenses to produce and distribute women’s clothing and accessories of the following brands:

- since 1983: Rifat Ozbek
- since 2005: Basso & Brooke
- since 2015: Jeremy Scott

Other brands licenses have included:

- 1994–2012: Jean Paul Gaultier
- 1997–2007: Narciso Rodriguez
- 2004–2006: Sinha-Stanic
- 2009–2012: Cacharel
- 2012–2015: Emanuel Ungaro
- 2012–2020: Cédric Charlier

=== Owned brands ===
Aeffe took control of Pollini in late 2000 and introduced an apparel line in 2003. In the following years, Rifat Ozbek (2004–2007) and Jonathan Saunders (2008) served as the brand's creative directors. The apparel line was discontinued in 2010 as Nicholas Kirkwood was promoted to creative director of the brand. By 2011, Aeffe acquired the remaining 28 percent of Pollini from York Srl for 1.2 million euros, making it the sole shareholder.

In 2021, Aeffe acquired full control of Moschino through the acquisition of the remaining 30 percent stake it had not owned before.

== Alberta Ferretti ==
In 1968, Alberta Ferretti opened her first boutique, called Jolly, in Cattolica. She designed a first collection in 1973 and began showing seasonal collections on the runways of Milan in 1981. She launched Ferretti Jeans Philosophy in 1989, renamed Philosophy di Alberta Ferretti in 1994. In 1994 she renovated a 13th-century castle into the Palazzo Viviani hotel in Montegridolfo.

In October 1993 Ferretti presented clothes reminiscent of The Great Gatsby for the Milan ready-to-wear shows. One of her designs was a long and trim gingham dress, in pale blue. A flapper showed a beige crocheted dress styled just above the knee. Her renditions of the toga for the production were diverse. They were simple gowns, some of them short, others long and draped.

Ferretti is known for her designs featuring twisting, tucking, and draping techniques. Her style employs a subtle layered look, sometimes showing a hint of hand-beaded gauze which extends slightly beneath the hem of a wool dress. The erotic qualities of the chiffon and jersey fashions she introduced for her spring 2008 fashion collection is evident in the look of her dresses. Many of them are cut high in the front and draped low in the back. Her target customer is the cocktail crowd. Specifically the dresses are party frocks, above the knee, and enhanced by rhinestone rosettes and armour-like chain mail. Feretti's collection includes pleated bubbled coats, toga-like minidresses and skirts, and a sparse number of gowns of soft mint green and white hues. The minidresses and skirts were shown with ethereal models wearing metallic gladiator flats.

In July 2011 her collection was presented at the catwalk of The Brandery fashion show in Barcelona.

In 2021, Ferretti unveiled the brand’s first athleisure capsule collection.

In September 2024, Ferretti announced her retirement from creative directing her namesake label after 41 years. She retains her seat on the board of Aeffe.

=== Fragrances ===
Ferretti signed a licensing deal with Procter & Gamble for a fragrance line in 2000. The brand's first ever women's fragrance was only launched in 2009.

=== Collaborations ===
In 2011, Ferretti worked with Emma Watson on a collection labeled Pure Threads by Emma Watson Alberta Ferretti, produced with materials and techniques that are environmentally friendly and made in Italy. From 2019, another capsule collection using only eco-friendly materials such as recycled cashmere and organic cotton was launched in collaboration with Livia Firth.

In 2018, Ferretti created the staff uniforms for Italy’s largest airline company, Alitalia.

In 2022, Ferretti designed a limited-edition Lancia Ypsilon compact car.

=== Diffusion line ===
Since 1984, Ferreti has been operating Philosophy, a diffusion line. The brand has been showing its collections at New York Fashion Week. Past creative directors have included Natalie Ratabesi (2011–2014) and Lorenzo Serafini (since 2014).

Introduced in 2018, the manufacturing and distribution of Philosophy di Lorenzo Serafini’s childrenswear collections have been licensed to Gimel (2018–2024) and Monnalisa (2025–2032).

The Philosophy label was integrated into the Alberta Ferretti line from the fall 2025 season.

=== Campaigns ===
The Alberta Ferretti brand's advertising campaigns have been shot by photographers including Ellen von Unwerth (1995), Paolo Roversi (2001), Steven Meisel (2016) and Tim Walker (2017).

=== Stores ===
By 1998 Ferretti opened in-store boutiques for selling her signature and Philosophy di Alberta Ferretti lines at Bergdorf Goodman. Next she obtained her initial American freestanding store in SoHo. This business, near Prince Street, is exclusively for her Philosophy collection, the lower priced edition of Ferretti's signature line intended for younger women. In contrast to most designers, she started boutiques for her secondary lines prior to opening a flagship store for her signature collection. Ferretti's West Broadway building is located next door to a Rizzoli bookstore. It is a Federal style architecture townhouse built in the late 19th century. It was renovated with a three-story glass front and skylights, so that the interior was filled with natural light. The 1,000-square-foot (93 m^{2}) store was designed by Manhattan architect David Ling.

== Recognition ==
Ferretti was among a group of Italian designers who were invited to a reception for 200 designers and retailers held by Prime Minister Margaret Thatcher at 10 Downing Street, in October 1988.

Ferretti received the America Award of the Italy-USA Foundation in 2018.
