= Rossella Jardini =

Italian fashion designer and businessperson

Rossella Jardini (born 1952 in Bergamo), is an Italian fashion designer and businessperson who from 1994 to 2013 worked as Creative Director for Moschino following the death of Franco Moschino. In January 2014 she took up a new role as consultant for Missoni.

Early life

Jardini had worked with Nicola Trussardi and Bottega Veneta before joining Moschino full-time in 1983. Following Moschino's death, she supervised the fashion house's output and designs, although did not design herself. In 2013 she was succeeded by Jeremy Scott as creative director of Moschino, and in January 2014, joined Missoni as a design consultant.
