= Pollini (fashion house) =

Italian fashion house

- Type: S.p.a.
- Industry: Fashion
- Founded: 1953; 73 years ago San Mauro Pascoli, Italy
- Founder: Alberto Pollini, Lidia Pollini, Lucia Pollini, Vittorio Pollini
- Headquarters: Gatteo, Italy
- Area served: International boutiques: Minsk, Podgorica, Tbilisi, Warsaw
- Key people: Marco Piazzi (General manager); Natalia Battaglini (Head of Style)
- Services: Fashion production, ready to wear
- Revenue: €96.6 million
- Net income: €408,733
- Owner: Aeffe
- Website: www.pollini.com

Pollini S.p.a. is an Italian fashion house founded in 1953 by four siblings of the Pollini family in San Mauro Pascoli, Forlì-Cesena Province. The company specializes in the production of leather footwear and handbags. Marco Piazzi is its current general manager.

== History ==
The company was founded in 1953 in the northern Romagna hinterland by Alberto, Lidia, Lucia and Vittorio Pollini, the children of shoemaker Ettore Pollini. Alongside its initially predominant footwear production, the company gradually expanded into the manufacture of leather handbags, including the renowned Daytona, which was exhibited at the Fashion Institute of Technology Museum in New York.

In 2000, following the acquisition of the brand by the Italian luxury holding company Aeffe, founded by Alberta Ferretti, Pollini, alongside its own production, began manufacturing a large portion of the accessory collections for the group's other brands, including Moschino.

== Boutiques ==
As of early 2026, Pollini has boutiques in: Milan, Rome, Venice, Bolzano, Brescia, Pavia, Piacenza, Lecco, Lodi, Genoa, Catania, Sassari, as well as stores abroad in Minsk, Podgorica, Tbilisi, and Warsaw.

== See also ==
- Italian fashion
- Made in Italy
