= Bruno Bruni (artist) =

Italian painter and sculptor

Bruno Bruni senior (born 22 November 1935) is an Italian lithographer, graphic artist, painter and sculptor. He became commercially successful in the 1970s. In 1977, he won the International Senefeld award for Lithography. He has since become one of the most successful Italian artists in Germany and one of Germany's best-known lithographers.

== Biography ==
Born in Gradara, in the Province of Pesaro and Urbino on the Adriatic Coast in 1935, the son of a railway attendant, Bruni started painting as a young boy. He was initially a pupil of Giuliano Vanghi; from 1953 to 1959 he attended the Art Institute in Pesaro. He then moved to London, where he became interested in pop art. In 1960, after an exhibit of his work at London's John Whibley Gallery, and after meeting a girl from Hamburg, he moved there to live with her and enrolled at the Hochschule für bildende Künste Hamburg. He has lived in the city ever since and visits his hometown regularly.

In the 1970s, Bruni made a name for himself as a draftsman, lithographer, painter and sculptor in the international art world. In 1977, he won the International Senefeld Competition for Lithography. He is influenced primarily by German expressionists such as Otto Dix and George Grosz, and by the Italian old masters. In particular, he is noted as one of the few lithographic artists "who paint all work directly onto the stone". He is especially known for his erotic female forms. He has said, "I cannot paint an abstract picture. If I had gone along with the trends I'd have disappeared long ago". He resides in a converted swimming pool, more than a century old, which serves as apartment, workplace and gallery. He sells his art through his wife's gallery in Hanover and is reputedly one of Germany's top-earning artists. He is also a keen cook of Italian cuisine, and is a boxing fan and a close friend of former boxing champion Dariusz Michalczewski, for whom he used to cook before matches. He has also cooked for Gerhard Schröder and has published a cooking book with his favourite recipes, memoirs and pictures related to his life.

== Selected works ==
=== Drawings and paintings ===
- Der gelbe Stern (1961) pen
- Kleines Veilchen (1961) pencil and gouache
- Con bicchiere (1963) pencil on grey paper
- stop (1963) gouache

=== Graphic art ===
- Manfred (1961) drypoint
- Donna-fiore (1965) lithography
- Knospe I (1966) lithography
- Metamorphosis (1970) lithography in four colours
- Onda (1973) lithography in three colours
- Amanti (1978) lithography in seven colours
- Figure e fiori (1980) sequence of five lithographies
- Nicht sehen, nicht reden, nicht hören (1979) lithography in five colours

=== Bronze Sculptures ===
- Der Kuss sculpture (1960) Bronze
- La sorella (1962) Bronze
- Europa und der Stier Bronze
- Il Ritorno (1980) Bronze
- La venere sdraiata (1982) Bronze
- Candelieri da Pergola(1991) Bronze

== Bibliography ==
- Volker Huber: Bruno Bruni - Farblithographien. Edition Volker Huber, Offenbach am Main 1989. ISBN 3-921785-44-8
- Bruno Bruni - Neue Arbeiten 1977 bis 1982. Athenäum Verlag, Königstein/Ts. 1982. ISBN 3-7610-8196-0
- Bruno Bruni: Gaumenfreuden und Kunstgenuss. Meine Art zu leben. Walter Hädecke Verlag, Weil der Stadt 2005. ISBN 3-7750-0460-2
