= Aeffe =

Italian fashion business

Aeffe S.p.A. is an Italian joint-stock company founded in 1988 that operates internationally in the luxury sector, producing ready-to-wear, footwear, leather goods, lingerie, and beachwear. The company has been listed on the Milan Stock Exchange (Borsa Italiana: AEF) since 2007, where it is included in the FTSE Italia Small Cap index. In 2019, Aeffe made €12.0 million net profit on revenues of €351.4 million.

The group develops collections and operates for the proprietary brands Alberta Ferretti, Philosophy di Lorenzo Serafini, Moschino, and Pollini, as well as the licensed brands Cédric Charlier, Jeremy Scott, and Blugirl Folies. The group has also licensed to certain partners the production and distribution of other product categories including fragrances, children's and junior lines, watches, and eyewear.

== History ==
In 1972, designer Alberta Ferretti began her business as a sole proprietorship. In 1988, a company called Faar s.r.l. was established, which transferred the business to Faar. In 1990, the company was transformed into a joint-stock company, becoming the current Aeffe S.p.A. The first collaboration with other designers dates back to 1983, when the company began producing Franco Moschino's Moschino Couture line under license.

The group's growth has been accompanied over the years by collaborations with other leading designers, such as Jean-Paul Gaultier since 1995 (the collaboration ended with the Spring/Summer 2013 collection) and Narciso Rodriguez since 1998 (the collaboration ended in 2007). The group has been the exclusive licensee of the brands Cédric Charlier since 2011 and Emanuel Ungaro since 2012 (the partnership ended in 2015). In the early 2000s, Aeffe held a 50 percent stake in the Narciso Rodriguez fashion house.

From 2000 to 2006, Sanpaolo IMI – through Nuova Holding Subalpina – held a 20 percent share in Aeffe; it had purchased that share for $44.5 million.

=== Licensing ===
Under several agreements, the company has been holding licenses to produce and distribute women’s clothing and accessories of the following brands:

- since 1983: Rifat Ozbek
- since 2005: Basso & Brooke
- since 2015: Jeremy Scott

Other brands licenses have included:

- 1994–2012: Jean Paul Gaultier
- 1997–2007: Narciso Rodriguez
- 2004–2006: Sinha-Stanic
- 2009–2012: Cacharel
- 2012–2015: Emanuel Ungaro
- 2012–2020: Cédric Charlier

=== Owned brands ===
Aeffe took control of Pollini in late 2000 and introduced an apparel line in 2003. In the following years, Rifat Ozbek (2004–2007) and Jonathan Saunders (2008) served as the brand's creative directors. The apparel line was discontinued in 2010 as Nicholas Kirkwood was promoted to creative director of the brand. By 2011, Aeffe acquired the remaining 28 percent of Pollini from York Srl for 1.2 million euros, making it the sole shareholder.

In 2021, Aeffe acquired full control of Moschino through the acquisition of the remaining 30 percent stake it had not owned before.

Euroitalia has been making the Moschino fragrances since 1987. In 2024, Aeffe sold its Moschino brand cosmetics and perfumes business to Euroitalia for €98 million ($110 million).

== See also ==
- LVMH
- Kering
- Authentic Brands Group
- New Guards Group
- Catalyst Brands
