= Gradara =

- Comune
- Comune di Gradara
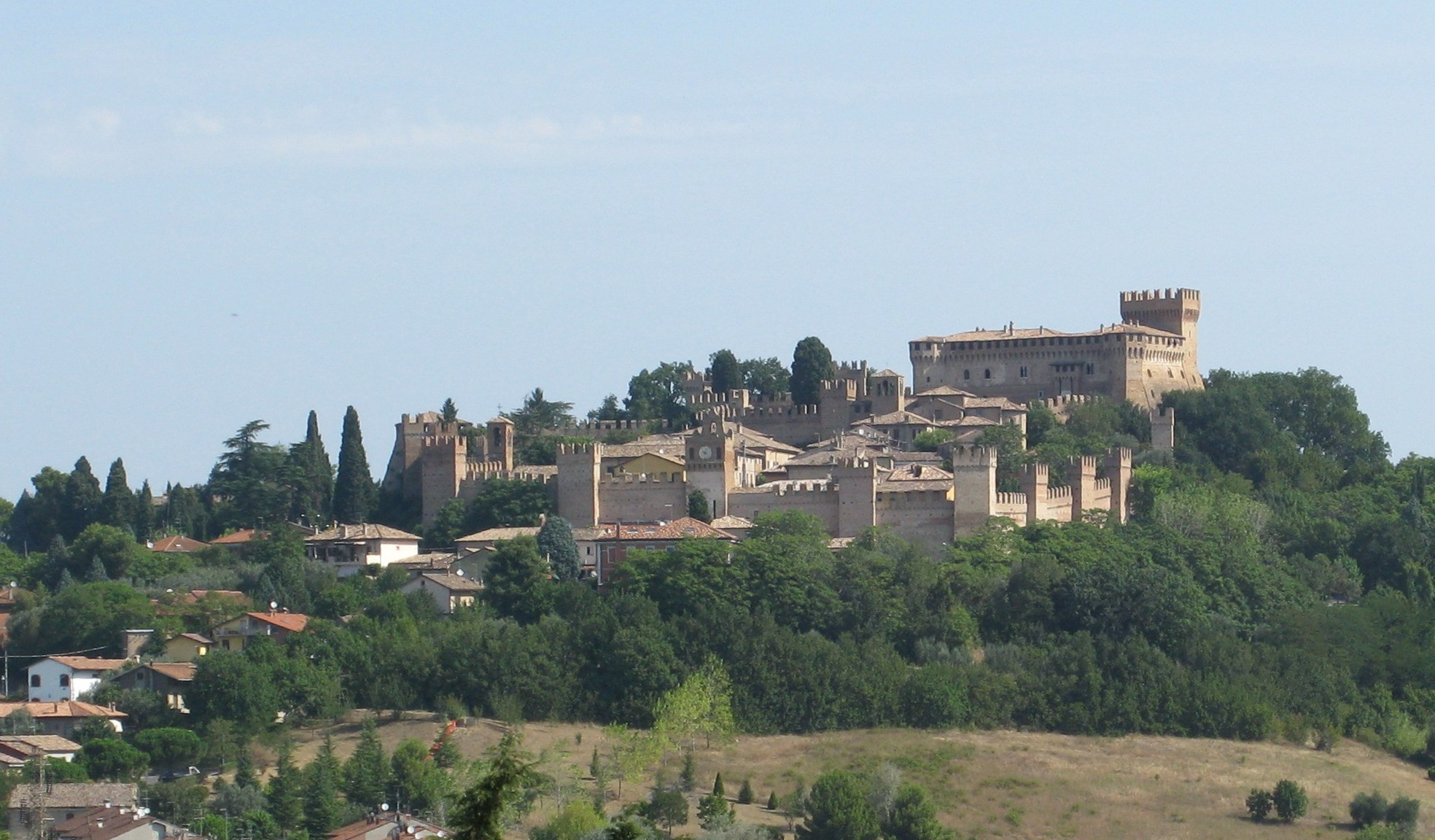
- View of Gradara

- Coat of arms

- Location within Italy Location within Marche
- Coordinates: 43°56′N 12°46′E
- Country: Italy
- Region: Marche
- Province: Pesaro e Urbino (PU)
- Frazioni: Santo Stefano, Fanano alta, Fanano Bassa, Granarola, pievecchia

Government
  - Mayor: Filippo Gasperi

Area
  - Total: 17 km^{2} (6.6 sq mi)
- Elevation: 142 m (466 ft)

Population (December 31, 2004)
  - Total: 3,361
  - Density: 200/km^{2} (510/sq mi)
- Demonym: Gradaresi
- Time zone: UTC+1 (CET)
  - Summer (DST): UTC+2 (CEST)
- Postal code: 61012
- Dialing code: 0541
- Patron saint: San Terenzio
- Saint day: third sunday of September

Gradara is a town and comune in the Province of Pesaro e Urbino (PU), in the region of Marche in central Italy. It is 6 km from Gabicce Mare and Cattolica, 25 km from Rimini, 15 km from Pesaro and 33 km from Urbino. It is one of I Borghi più belli d'Italia ("The most beautiful villages of Italy").

The ancient town is characterized by a double line of medieval walls and by the massive castle, one of the best preserved in Italy. It is famous as being the location of the episode of Paolo and Francesca described by Dante Alighieri in the V Canto of his Inferno. With its castle as a major tourist attraction, the town is considered by some to be functionally an extension of the riviera romagnola.

== History ==
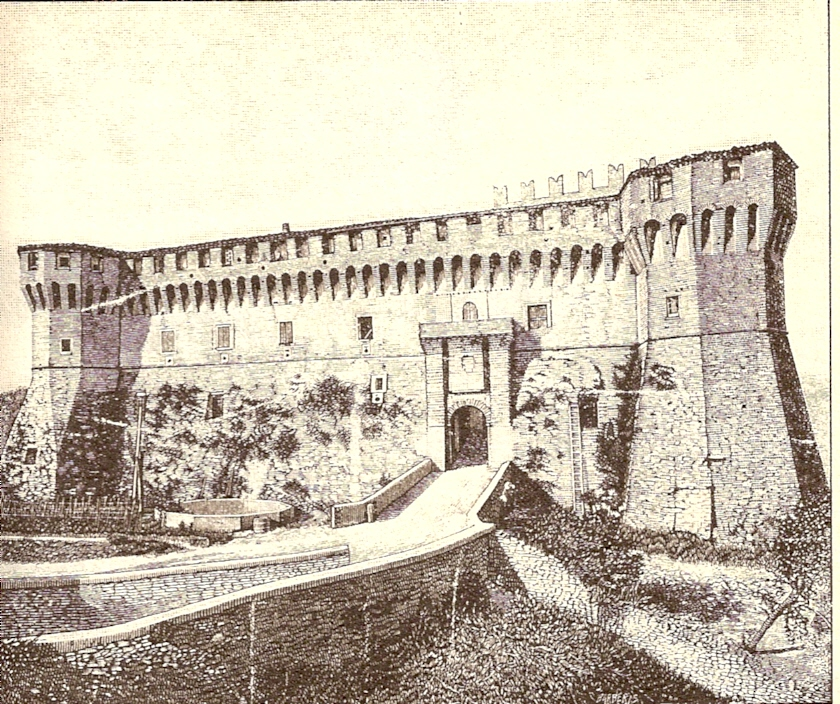
The Rocca (Castle) of Gradara.

The construction of the castle was begun in the 12th century by Pietro and Ridolfo del Grifo. Later, Malatesta da Verucchio captured the Grifo tower, which became the mastio of the current castle, which was to be finished in the 15th century.

After the Malatesta seignory, the town was conquered by the Sforza in the September 1289. Here, in 1494, arrived Lucrezia Borgia, wife of Giovanni Sforza. After a short domination of Lucrezia's brother, Cesare, Gradara was handed over to the della Rovere. After the end of the latter's dynasty, the city was administered directly by the Popes.

In November 2019, the South Ossetian foreign minister Dmitry Medoyev paid a courtesy visit to Gradara, where he met with Mayor Filippo Gasperi and President of the Administration Frederico Marmarella. Both sides discussed issues of humanitarian and cultural cooperation. In the course of the visit an agreement was reached to hold an exhibition of paintings by Ossetian artists in Gradara as part of the Days of Ossetian Culture in Europe in July 2022.

== Notable people ==
- Alberta Ferretti (1950–), fashion designer
- Bruno Bruni (1935–), lithographer

== See also ==
- Gradara Castle
