= Davide Renne =

Italian fashion designer (1977–2023)

- Born: 4 July 1977; Follonica, Tuscany, Italy
- Died: 10 November 2023 (aged 46); Milan, Lombardy, Italy
- Education: University of Florence; Polimoda
- Years active: 2000–2023

Davide Renne (4 July 1977 – 10 November 2023) was an Italian fashion designer who was the creative director of Moschino after a stint as head of women’s wear at Gucci.

== Life and career ==
Born on 4 July 1977 in Follonica, Tuscany, Renne attended the University of Florence at Polimoda. He began his career with Alessandro Dell'Acqua in 2000, before joining Gucci in 2004. He remained there until 2023, when he was named creative director for Moschino.

== Death ==
Renne died from a heart attack in a Milan hospital on 10 November 2023 at the age of 46.
