= Franco Moschino =

Italian fashion designer (1950–1994)

- Born: 27 February 1950; Abbiategrasso, Lombardy, Italy
- Died: 18 September 1994 (aged 44); Brianza, Italy
- Education: Accademia delle Belle Arti
- Labels: Moschino Couture!; Cheap and Chic by Moschino; Moschino Uomo; Moschino Jeans; Love Moschino

Franco Moschino (27 February 1950 – 18 September 1994) was an Italian fashion designer who founded eponymous luxury Italian fashion house Moschino.

== Early years ==
Moschino was born in Abbiategrasso, Lombardy, located about 22 kilometres (14 mi) from Milan. Moschino's family owned an iron foundry in which his father hoped he would work. However, Moschino was interested in fine art and aspired to be a painter. In 1968, he ran away from home to Milan where he enrolled at the Brera Academy. To finance his studies, he worked as a freelance fashion illustrator for fashion houses and magazines. The experience prompted Moschino to switch his focus to fashion and drop out from the academy to study at the Marangoni Institute. After completing his schooling in 1971, Moschino became an illustrator for Gianni Versace, and continued to work for him for another six years. From 1977 to 1982, he designed for the Italian label Cadette.

== Career ==
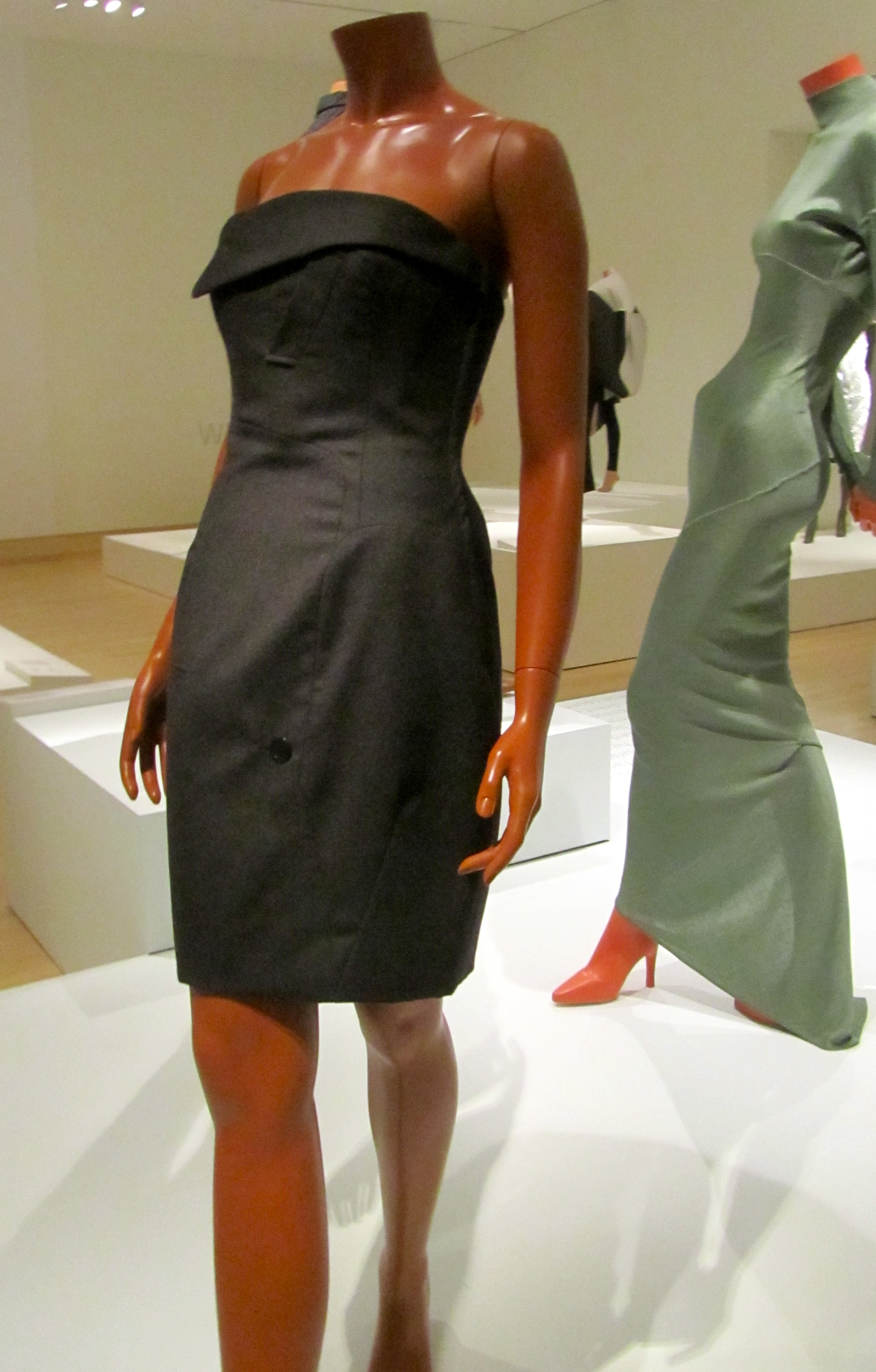
A Franco Moschino wool dress made from heavy men's suit fabric, 1990

Moschino founded his own company, Moonshadow, in 1983 and launched the Moschino Couture! later that same year. At first, he designed casualwear and jeans, but his line eventually expanded to lingerie, eveningwear, shoes, menswear and perfumes. In 1988, he launched a less expensive Cheap and Chic line.

Moschino's designs were very innovative and unusual such as quilted black denim miniskirt with plastic fried eggs decorating the hemline, quilted jacket decorated with bottle tops, plug-socket drop earrings, and bodices made out of safety pins. He was dubbed the Jean-Paul Gaultier of Italian fashion for his highly innovative designs although, as Moschino pointed out, their styles are different; while Gaultier experimented with different fabrics and shapes, Moschino used basic forms and traditional methods. He also spoofed high fashion lines through his clothes. For example, "Expensive Jacket" was embroidered in gold across the back of a cashmere jacket, and "Bull Chic" on a matador-styled outfit. Moschino also mocked the fashion classics such as the Chanel jacket with garish trimmings and details. Many rushed to wear his clothes, thus becoming successful and famous in the industry he satirized.

The year before his death, Moschino worked to raise money for hospices for children with AIDS.

== Death ==
In 1992, Moschino underwent surgery for an abdominal tumor. On 18 September 1994, he died at his lakeside villa in Brianza, Italy, of cardiac arrest, reportedly from complications from surgery. Moschino's death was AIDS-related.

== Legacy ==
After his death, Rossella Jardini, his former assistant, became creative director of the brand. In October 2013, LA designer Jeremy Scott took over as creative director and showed his first Moschino collection on the runway in fall 2014. Moschino clothes have been worn by celebrities such as Madonna, Diana, Princess of Wales, Fran Drescher on her hit television show The Nanny, Katy Perry, Alicia Silverstone, Kylie Minogue, Rick Ross, Gwyneth Paltrow, Anna Friel, Miley Cyrus, Patti LaBelle and Nicki Minaj.
