= Gradara Castle =

Medieval fortress in Gradara, Italy

Coordinates: 43°56′34″N 12°46′28″E

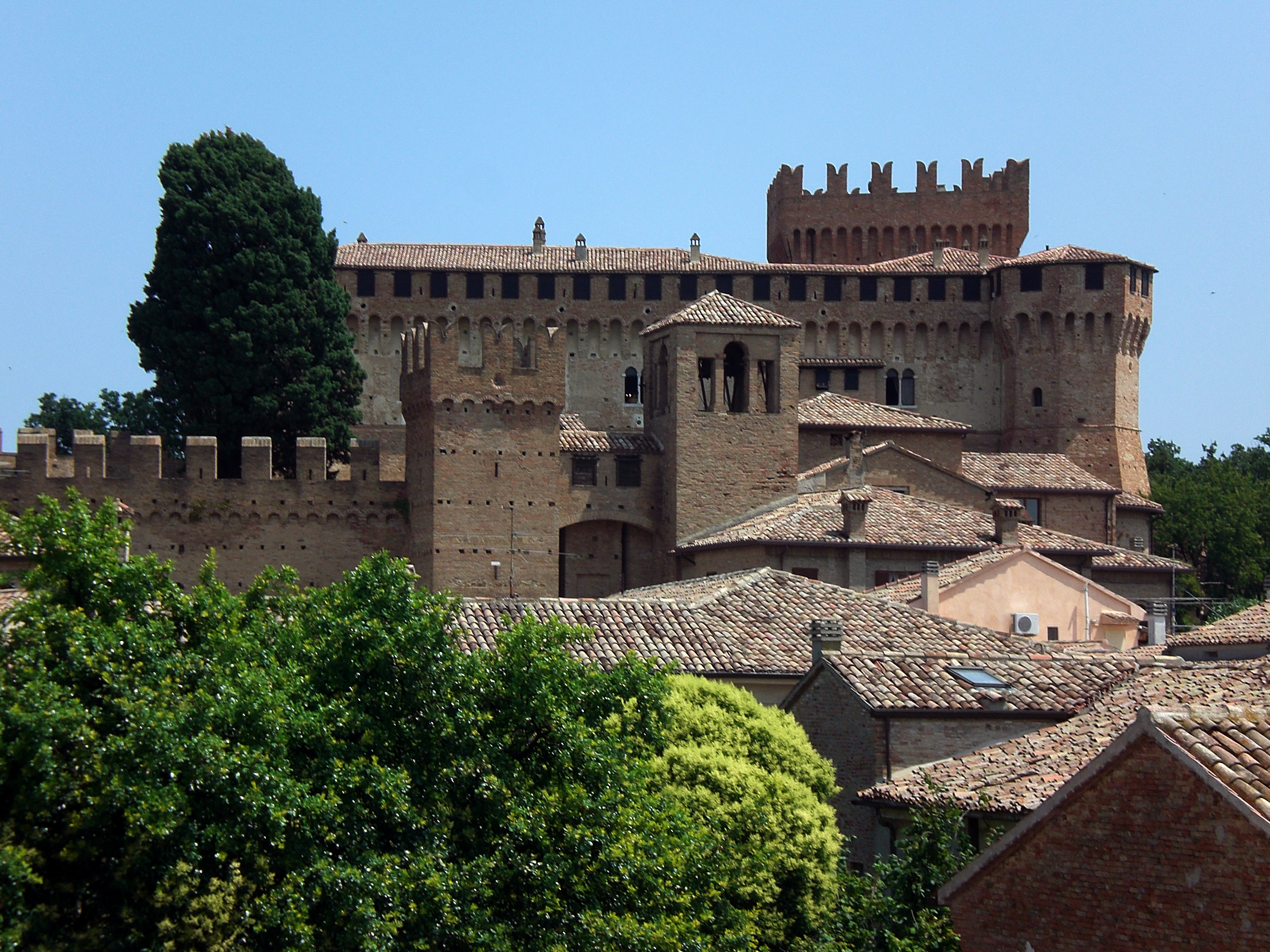
The Castle

The Gradara Castle is a medieval fortress that is located in the town of Gradara, Marche, in Italy. It is protected by two walls, the outermost of which extends for almost 800 metres, making it an imposing structure. Particularly striking is the view of the fortress and the underlying historical village at night. The castle is one of the most visited monuments in the region and is the scene of museum events, musical and artistic. Gradara was, by geographical position, since ancient times a crossroads of traffic and people: during the Middle Ages, the fortress was one of the main theatres of clashes between militias loyal to the papacy and the turbulent families Romagna and Marche.

Situated at 142 metres above sea level, with the Republic of San Marino, Rimini and Carpegna in the background, Gradara represents an extraordinary urban and architectural combination. Legend has it that the castle was the scene of the famous and tragic love story of Paolo and Francesca, caught in each other's arms and killed by Gianciotto, Francesca's husband. This love story was immortalized by Dante in his Divine Comedy.

The Gradara Castle dates back to the period between the 11th and 15th centuries. Its history is inextricably linked with the infamous feuds between the Malatesta and Montefeltro families. This long-standing conflict came to a halt only after the control of the castle fell into the hands of the Sforza family. It was Dante, however, who intervened with his Divine Comedy, making the castle the locale for the tale of Paolo and Francesca and thus turning the castle forever into a symbol of love.

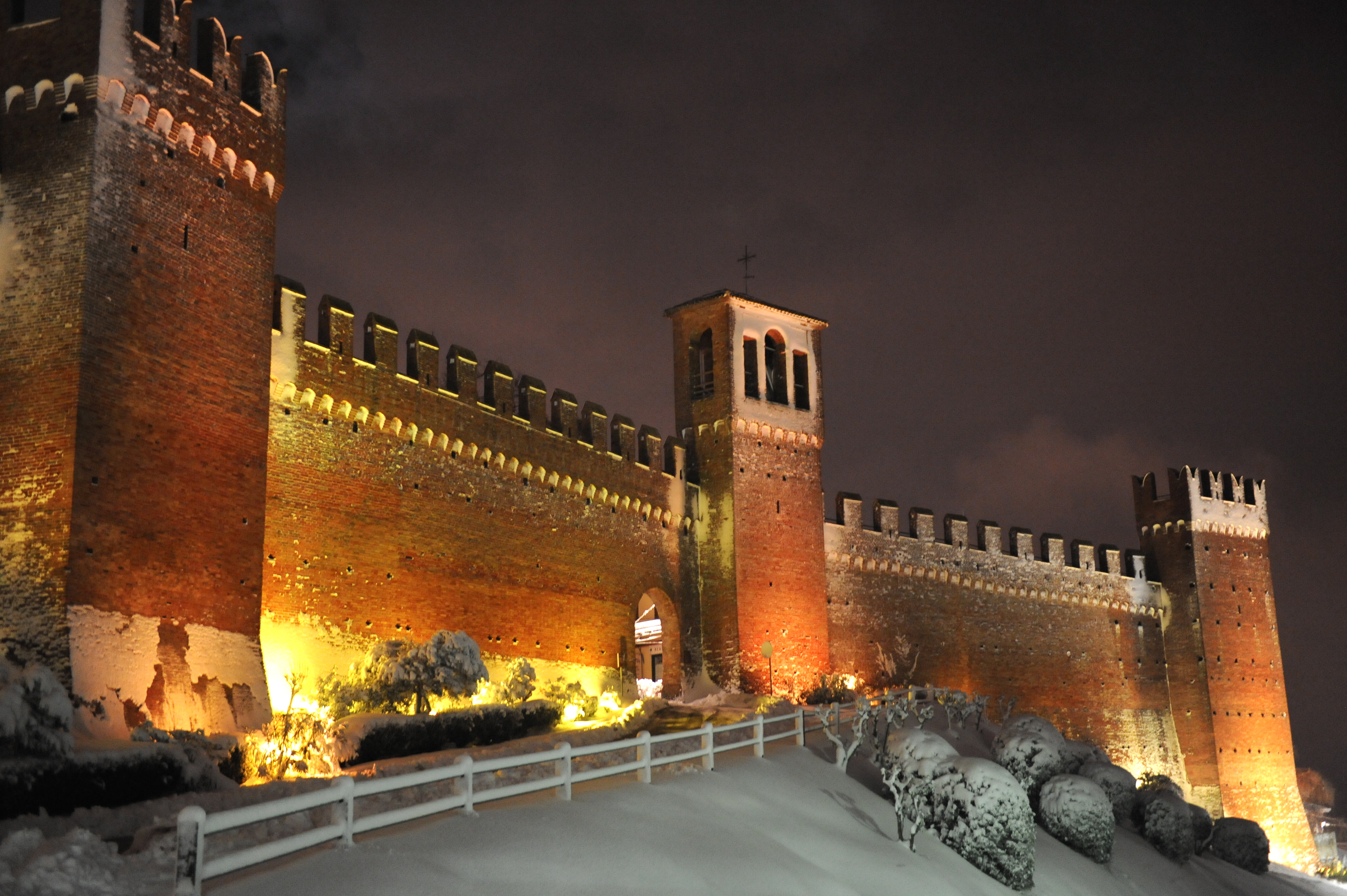
Gradara in winter

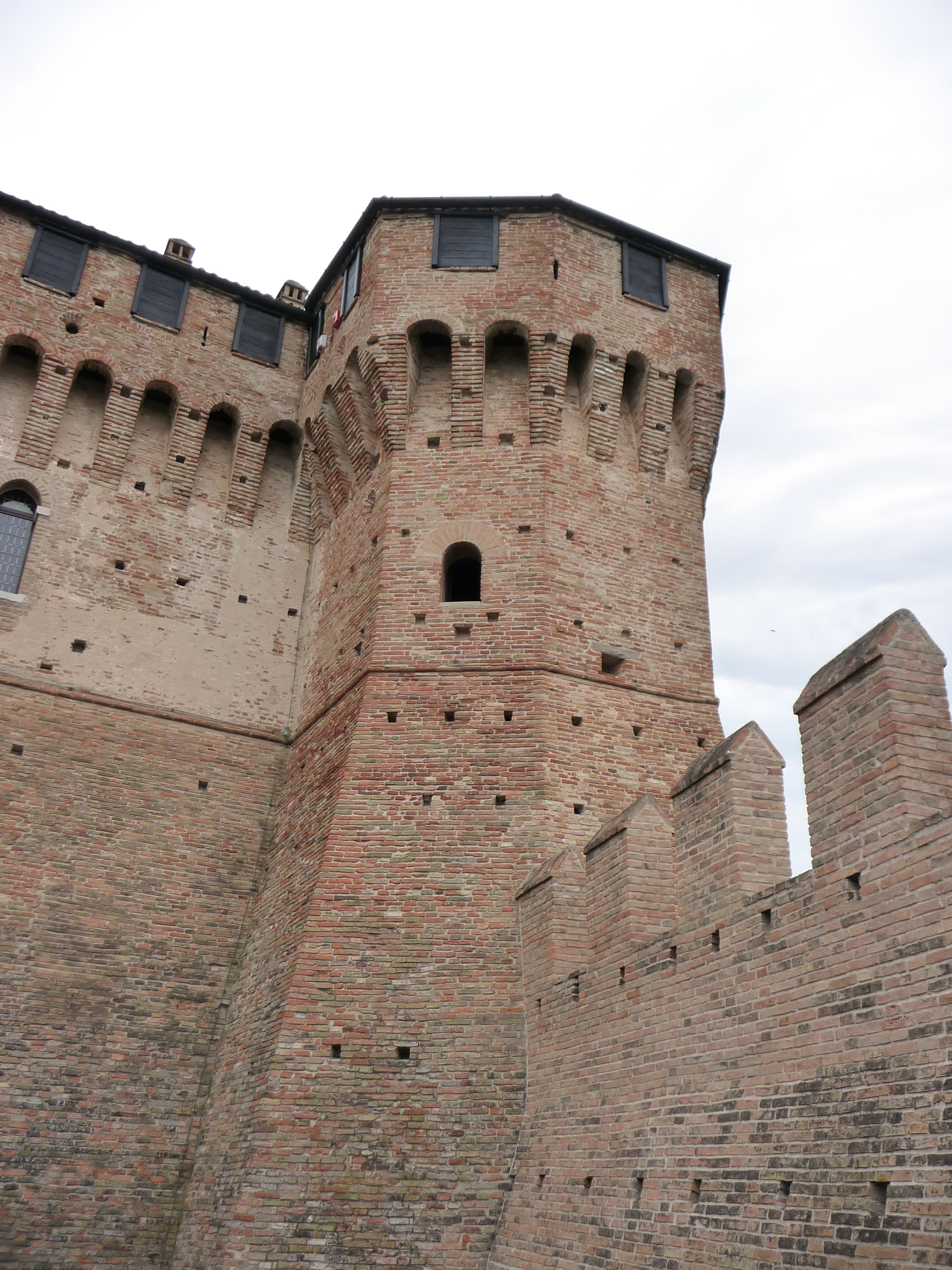
One of towers

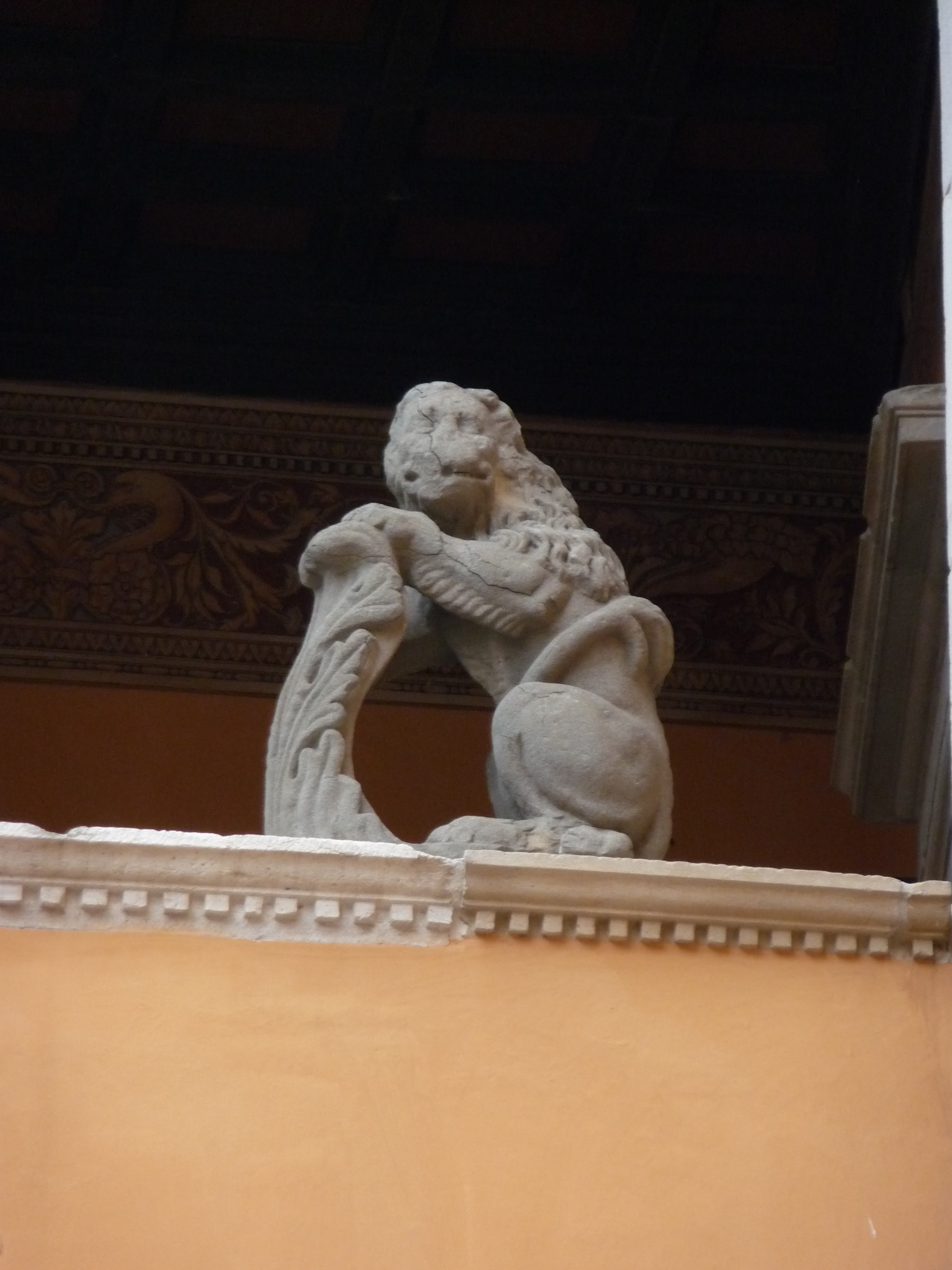
A sculpture
