= Rifat Ozbek =

British fashion designer

- Rıfat Özbek
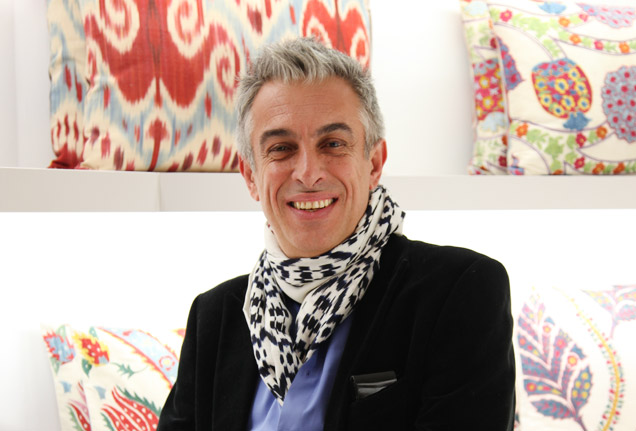
- Ozbek in 2017
- Born: 1953 (age 72–73); Istanbul, Marmara, Turkey
- Citizenship: British
- Education: University of Liverpool; Saint Martin's School of Art
- Occupation: Fashion designer
- Partner: Erdal Karaman

Rifat Ozbek (Turkish: Rıfat Özbek, pronounced [ɾɯˈfat ˈœzbec]; born 1953) is a Turkish-born fashion and interior designer, known for his exotic, ethnically-inspired outfits. He was named British Designer of the Year in 1988 and 1992.

== Biography ==
Rifat Ozbek was born in Istanbul, Turkey and grew up in a yalı on the Bosphorus. He moved to the United Kingdom to study architecture at the University of Liverpool in 1970, graduating in 1972. He then lived in his parents' flat in Belgravia while studying fashion at Saint Martin's School of Art from 1974 to 1977.

After graduating in 1977, Ozbek went to Italy where he worked in Milan between 1978 and 1980, then in London with Monsoon. In 1984, he established his own company, Ozbek, and began to show his yearly collections in Milan and New York City, and later, in Paris.

In 1987 the production of his studio line, Future Ozbek, was licensed to Aeffe S.p.A., in Italy, and his notoriety continued to grow. By 1995, he had launched his own perfume called "Ozbek", and later a second, "Ozbek 1001".

The fall 1999/spring 2000 collections of many designers reflected the very aesthetic that Ozbek valued for over a decade — the mixing of contrasting patterns, shapes, and ornamentation, along with bits and pieces borrowed from a global grab bag.

In 2010, Ozbek launched a new business called "Yastik", which means "pillow" in Turkish, and opened his first London store under the brand. Özbek was an interior designer for Robin Birley's new nightclub, 5 Hertford Street, which opened in 2012.

He lives between Notting Hill, London; Istanbul; and Yalıkavak, Bodrum with his partner Erdal Karaman.

== Style ==
Ozbek is inspired by adornment. He is an observer of culture and subculture, from Tibetan to American Indian, and his interest in decoration is evident in his ornamental clothing. He gained notoriety by combining the decorative symbols and shapes of diverse cultures, such as the Far East, Africa, and his native Turkey, with the classic silhouettes of the West. Ozbek created eclectic clothing with the intention of encouraging urban consumers to embrace "ethnic chic". His use of embroidery, tassels, and vivid colors, such as turquoise and fuchsia, was completely at odds with the established conventions of 1980s power dressing; nevertheless, his anti-fashion approach to modern dressing received attention from those who appreciated the departure from sharp-edged suiting.

Ozbek's designs reflected both club scene and New Age influences, when in 1990, he made clear his views on spiritualism by presenting an all-white collection. His popularity was sustained throughout the 1990s as he continued his investigation of culture and subculture, taking street fashion to the runway with the addition of baseball caps covered with sequins.

== Awards ==
- 1986: Woman Magazine Designer Award
- 1988: British Designer of the Year
- 1989: British Glamour Award
- 1992: British Designer of the Year
