= Jeremy Scott =

American fashion designer (born 1975)

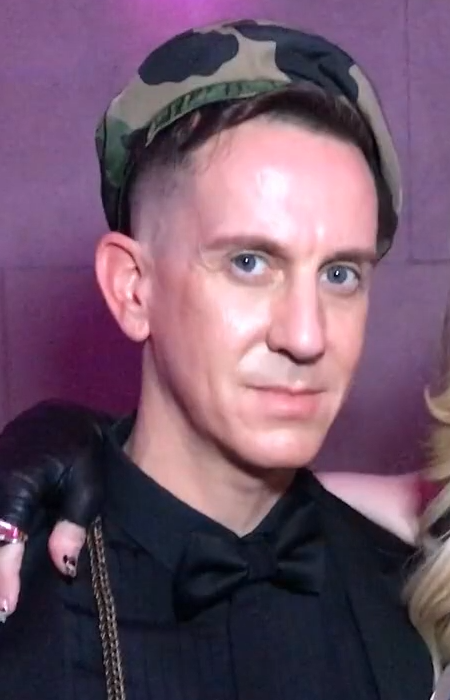
- Scott at the 2017 Met Gala
- Born: August 8, 1975 (age 51); Kansas City, Missouri, U.S.
- Education: Pratt Institute
- Occupation: Fashion designer
- Labels: Jeremy Scott (1997–present); Adidas (2008–present); Moschino (2013–2023)

Jeremy Scott (born August 8, 1975) is an American fashion designer. He is the sole owner of his namesake label, and from October 2013 to March 2023 was the creative director of the fashion house Moschino. Since launching his brand in Paris in 1997, Scott has built a reputation as "pop culture's most irreverent designer", and "fashion's last rebel".

Known for his designs of clothes, accessories and footwear for Adidas and Moschino, Scott has consistently worked with various celebrities such as Björk, Madonna, Katy Perry, CL and 2NE1, Nicki Minaj, Fergie, Beyoncé, Lady Gaga, Ariana Grande, Kanye West, Miley Cyrus, Demi Lovato, Selena Gomez, Justin Bieber, ASAP Rocky, M.I.A., Rita Ora, Cardi B, and Grimes. As an early proponent of blending high fashion with street style, he creates designs often incorporating pop-culture icons.

== Early life and education ==
Scott was born in 1975 in Kansas City, Missouri. He grew up partly on a farm in Lowry City and partly in a suburb outside Kansas City. Scott's parents are Jim, an engineer, and Sandy, a teacher. He has two older siblings, Barbara, a lawyer, and James. Since he began designing, members of his family have attended almost every show.

He was interested in fashion from an early age. He attended Hickman Mills High School. At 14, he began studying French and took night courses in Japanese because he was determined to become a fashion designer. In high school, he drew fashion in his notebooks and was bullied because of his dressing style. He discovered runway fashion in Details, looking up to Jean Paul Gaultier, Martin Margiela, Thierry Mugler, and Franco Moschino as role models. In 1992, Scott moved to New York to study fashion design at Pratt Institute, one of the city's Art and Design colleges, where he wore sci-fi-inspired clothes, "1880s vs 1980s" outfits, and shredded and decaying clothes. Scott did an internship in the New York offices of Aeffe, the company that owns Moschino.

== Career ==
=== Debut in Paris ===
After graduating in 1996 Scott moved to Paris. While looking for a job in the fashion industry, he was forced to scrounge meals and sleep in the Metro. When he ran into a PR for Jean Paul Gaultier who liked his hair (Scott cut his own hair since he was five), he got a job promoting parties at a nightclub. Not having any luck with fashion jobs, he decided to create his own brand.

The following season, in 1997, Jeremy Scott, the brand, made its debut in a bar near Bastille. The show was based on the J. G. Ballard book and David Cronenberg film Crash, with most of the material coming from paper hospital gowns. Scraps of fabric from the Porte de Clignancourt flea market resembling garbage bags were used in the follow-up show, all in black, which was described by Scott as "Blade Runner, trash bags and the apocalypse." The collection was later exhibited in the influential Parisian shop Colette, which has carried Jeremy Scott ever since.

His third collection, all in white, was a critical hit. It won awards and attracted Mario Testino, the editor of French Vogue, and Carlyne Cerf de Dudzeele, a French stylist, art director and photographer. The white show was the first runway appearance of the soon-to-be-supermodel Devon Aoki, who was only 13 at the time. (Twenty years later, the pair would collaborate again on Scott's Autumn/Winter 2016 campaign.) Björk was an early adopter, wearing an angel dress from the white show for her Homogenic world tour. Scott would provide costumes on several of her tours.

In the same year Scott made a show about 1980s decadence (sable, shoulder pads, big hair, gold lamé) as maybe the first designer to revive the eighties. The models' unbalanced heels were designed by Christian Louboutin. Opposing the prevalent minimalism, the show was panned by Vogue and others. Scott himself considers "the gold show" as the hardest moment of his career.

His 1998 spring collection titled "Duty Free Glamour" featured flight-attendant inspired looks and khaki jackets plastered with logos. Writing in The Times, the fashion critic Cathy Horyn pointed out the original use of the experience of a Midwesterner as a foil to jet set glamour. Karl Lagerfeld said that Scott was the only person working in fashion who could take over Chanel after he left.

In 2001 Scott left Paris for Los Angeles. It was seen as a surprising move, since Los Angeles was not yet a fashion capital at the time.

=== The Adidas collaboration ===
Scott had cemented his reputation as a cult label with fervid fans, particularly in Asia, but he was still on the fringe of the fashion establishment, as he was considered neither "serious" nor "commercial". He closed one show in 2001 by throwing fake banknotes with his face printed on them into the audience. At the close of another show, he shouted: "Vive l’avant-garde!", and left yellow T-shirts stamped with the message on every seat.

In 2006, Scott started his ongoing collaboration with the French leather-goods company Longchamp, which makes bags for front-row guests at his fashion shows.

Scott first worked with Adidas in 2002 for the "!Signed" project, for which he created a silk jacquard with a motif of money scattered around with his own likeness replacing that of George Washington. The design was on the Adidas classic high top model, the Forum. The shoe was handmade in the Adidas factory in Scheinfeld, Germany. There were only 100 pairs made: 50 went to Scott and 50 went to Adidas. Scott would revisit the design with Money Wings 2.0 in Fall/Winter 2013.

However, his best-known Adidas collaboration came in 2008, when Adidas Originals launched Scott's collection of footwear and apparel that included JS Wings (winged high-tops) and JS Bears (furry sneakers with teddy bear heads). With early co-signs from rappers like Lil Wayne, Scott's footwear gained him mass appeal. His sneakers are considered "some of the most eye-catching sneakers ever seen", making "an indisputable imprint on the shoe landscape". Over the years, his iconic wings adorned many different Adidas silhouettes. He also applied them to other objects for other clients, including Smart cars and baby prams.

He collaborated with Swatch in 2011, creating three watch designs that were hailed as the return of Swatch to its "uber-fun Eighties roots" with Scott's "pop aesthetic, fun twist and overstated form".

Scott starred in the Adidas 2012 print and video campaign with Nicki Minaj, Sky Ferreira and 2NE1. Madonna's dancers in the 2012 Super Bowl halftime show wore Jeremy Scott track suits for Adidas Originals.

In June 2012, Adidas decided that a pair of sneakers designed by Scott called the JS Roundhouse Mids would not be sold after the shoes were criticised for their bright yellow handcuffs which, as some believed, were "shackles" alluding to slavery. Scott denied that the shoes had anything to do with slavery, stating it was a reference to the children's toy My Pet Monster.

For his Fall 2012 collection, Scott introduced 1990s nostalgia, with several computer references like a printed gloved-hand cursor and '90s-era Mac screenshots. He made a show-closing homage to Lisa Frank with a vacuum-formed plexiglass bustier encrusted in hundreds of Frank stickers.

In February 2013, Scott plagiarized designs from Santa Cruz Skateboards. Santa Cruz and Scott reached a settlement whereby Scott ceased production of his collection.

He debuted his first fragrance for Adidas on February 1, 2015, in a glass replica of his Adidas winged sneakers. In the 2016 film Suicide Squad, the character Harley Quinn wears high-top heels from Jeremy Scott's 2014 collaboration with Adidas.

=== Creative director at Moschino ===
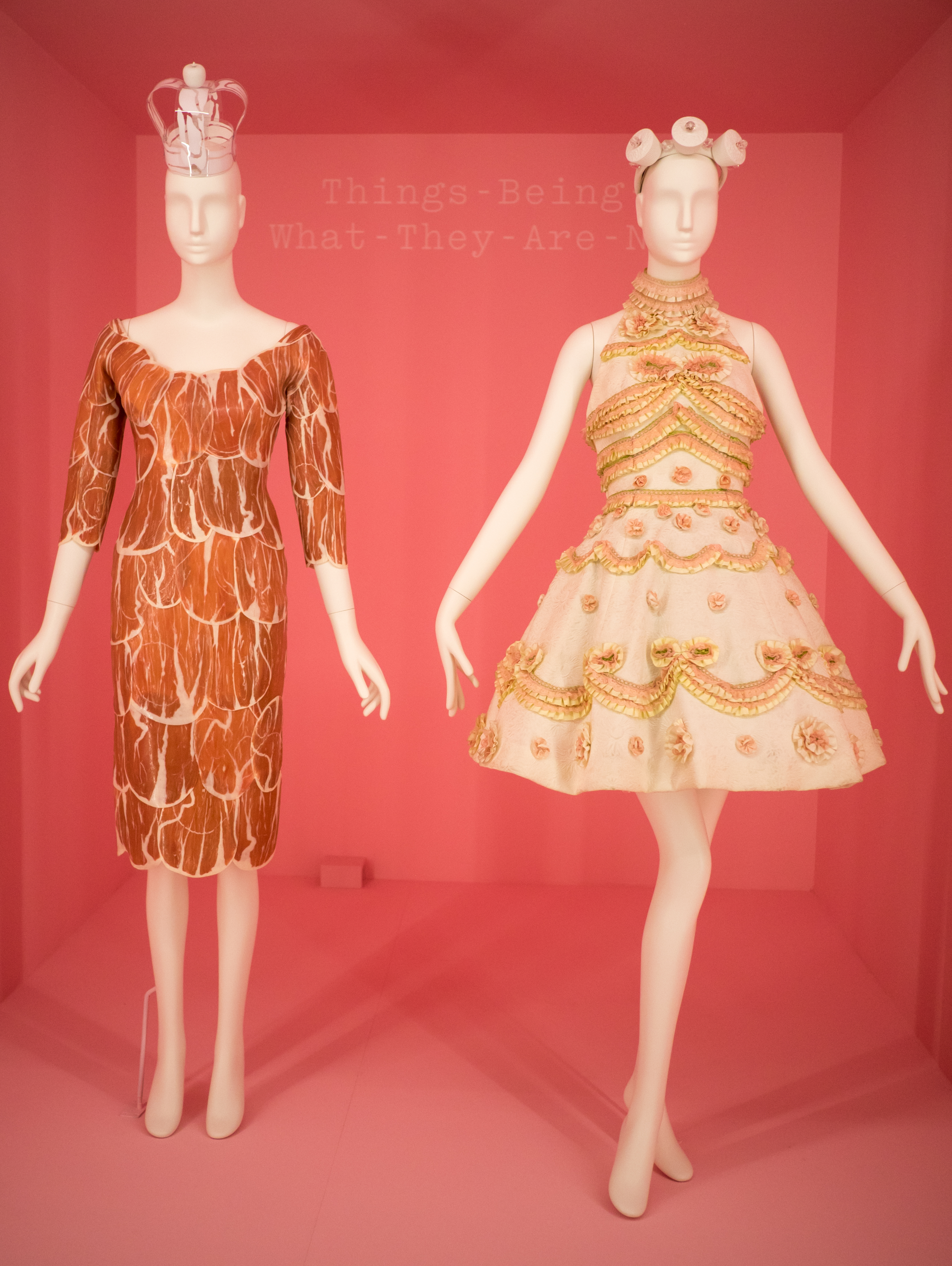
Dress by Scott [left] on display at The Met's exhibit Camp: Notes on Fashion

In October 2013 Scott became Moschino's creative director. After turning down several other offers, he chose the Italian label because it had a similarly irreverent approach, its founder Franco Moschino seeing fashion as a form of protest.

After redesigning the entire Pre-Fall collection, Scott showed his first Moschino collection in fall 2014. He re-told the fashion gags of Franco Moschino (rubbish bags, witty slogans, beefeater hats) through the eyes of an American (McDonald's handbags, popcorn dresses, nutrition-label ballgowns, SpongeBob SquarePants fur coats). An example of his proceeding was a vis-a-vis jacket in McDonald's colors (ketchup-red and bright yellow) with a matching quilted leather handbag bearing a golden "M" in the shape of a heart. His first Moschino fragrance was called Moschino Toy. The bottle literally looked like a teddy bear, with the spray nozzle under its head.

In his 2015 manifesto in The Guardian, Scott described his approach to American consumer culture: "An image of Mickey Mouse is understood in Mumbai, Timbuktu and Los Angeles in the same way. It's a clear message even if you subvert it by, say, putting Mickey ears on an army helmet (as I did in 2007)... A lot of my collections are informed by nostalgia." In fact, his fashion is often humorous: a 2016 show included a handbag that looked like a box of Marlboro Reds and bore the warning Fashion Kills.

In August 2015, Scott was sued along with Moschino for copyright infringement in relation to the Moschino Fall/Winter 2015 clothing line. The garments in question included "literal copies" of the plaintiff's work, according to the original complaint filed. The suit was settled out of court.

His Moschino Fall/Winter 2016 collection was inspired by the Florentine Bonfire of the Vanities of 1497. Dresses featured shards of mirrors, a fallen grand chandelier, and the innards of a destroyed grand piano. In a technical first, a few dresses were followed by trails of smoke on the runway because of integrated smoke machines inside them. At the same time, the Fall 2016 collection of his personal brand in New York included cartoony Max Headroom and rockabilly guitar prints, glitzy high-heeled cowboy boots, and cow print denim. It was called "Cowboys and Poodles" after a vintage store on Melrose Avenue in Los Angeles that introduced the 1950s rockabilly culture to the 1980s punks.

Scott created a TV commercial for the Moschino Barbie doll, which he wrote and art-directed, based on toy commercials of the eighties and nineties. It attracted attention as the first Barbie commercial to feature a boy. For the Moschino Spring/Summer 2017 collection, Scott commented on the internet generation's fixation on 2D screens. He used trompe-l'œil techniques to render Moschino's gold accessories, leather jackets, and larger-than-life branding in 2D, including life-sized pull tabs and stuck-on accessories of paper dolls of old.

Scott has been credited with reviving the Moschino brand, boosting its sales and turning it into a fan favorite.

On March 20, 2023, he announced his exit from the Creative Director position at Moschino.

=== Designing for celebrities ===
An important part of Scott's work has been outfitting show business celebrities such as Beyoncé, Rihanna, Lady Gaga, and Nicki Minaj. Some of them, like Katy Perry, Miley Cyrus, and CL, have collaborated with him so frequently that they have earned the nickname "the Jezza posse". Scott described his work with celebrities: "I understand the language of pop culture, and these people are totems of pop culture."

In January 2015, Scott created the costumes for the Super Bowl XLIX Half Time show performance of pop star Katy Perry. Perry introduced his custom bustier on the cover of Rolling Stone. The designer and the singer started collaborating ten years earlier, before Perry's first album came out.

Rihanna wore Jeremy Scott denim bra top and circle skirt in the "We Found Love" music video. The retro-futuristic stewardess frock worn by Britney Spears in her "Toxic" video was made by Scott. He designed Lady Gaga's outfit in "Paparazzi". For the 2015 Metropolitan Museum of Art's Anna Wintour Costume Center gala, Scott dressed Perry, as well as Madonna, whom he considers the original music/fashion icon. At the 2016 Met Gala, his outfits were worn by Nicki Minaj and Demi Lovato.

Scott dressed The Muppets' Miss Piggy for a photoshoot with Kermit the Frog as Andy Warhol. He has dressed Piggy on more than one occasion, including her front row appearance at his fashion show and for The Muppets world premiere. As the creative director for MTV Video Music Awards 2015, he redesigned the Moonman statuette.

Scott has been called fashion's equivalent of Andy Warhol. The Vulgar: Fashion Redefined, a British exhibition themed around different concepts of vulgarity, included Scott's sweet wrapper-themed dresses alongside Warhol's Souper Dress in the pop art-centric "Too Popular" section.

== Film Jeremy Scott: The People's Designer ==
Jeremy Scott: The People's Designer is a 2015 documentary film directed by Vlad Yudin detailing the life of Scott and his rise in the fashion industry. It was released on September 18, 2015. It features appearances by Katy Perry, Rihanna, Miley Cyrus, Rita Ora, Paris Hilton, ASAP Rocky and CL from 2NE1.

== Awards and honors ==
Scott won the ANDAM Fashion Award in 2000 and the Womenswear Designer of the Year award at the Annual Fashion Los Angeles Awards in 2015. He won the Venus de la Mode award for best new designer in 1998 and 1999 for his second and third collections and was nominated for Best Young Designer of 1999 by the Council of Fashion Designers of America.

Scott was the featured Guest Designer at the 88th Pitti Uomo, Florence's premier bi-annual menswear tradeshow. His Adidas sneakers were included in the Brooklyn Museum's "The Rise of Sneaker Culture" exhibit. He has agreed to hold a retrospective of his fashions at the Dallas Contemporary museum in 2017, on the 20th anniversary of his debut.

== Personal life ==
Scott is gay and has been open about his sexuality since the age of 14.

Scott owns two houses designed by John Lautner: the Foster Carling House (1947) in the Hollywood Hills and the Elrod House (1969) in Palm Springs. He is a vegetarian.
