= Moschino =

Italian fashion house

Moschino S.p.A.

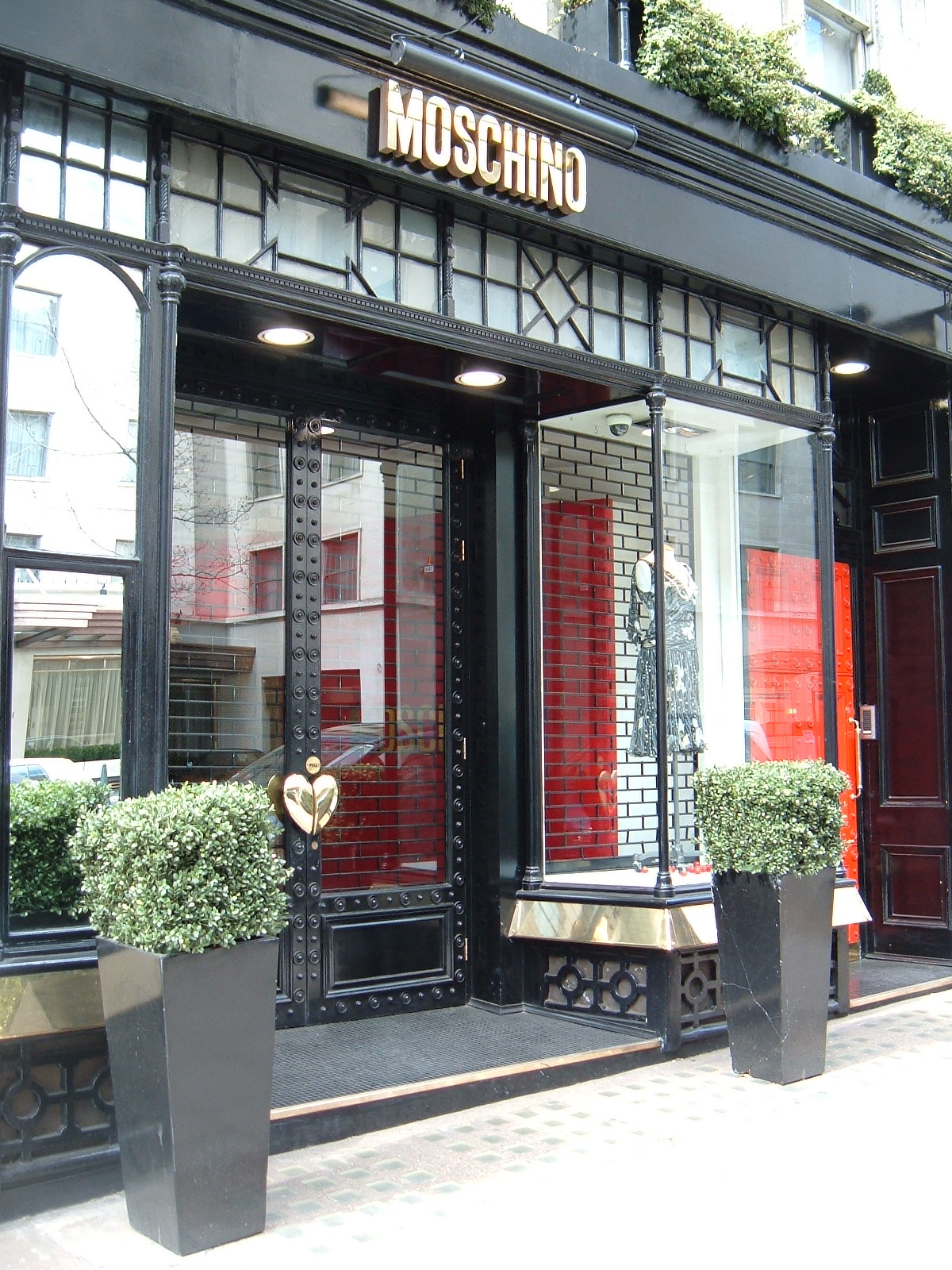
- Moschino storefront in London
- Type: Subsidiary
- Industry: Fashion
- Founded: 1983; 43 years ago in Milan, Italy
- Founder: Franco Moschino
- Headquarters: Via S. Gregorio, 28; 20124 Milan; Italy; 45.48020°N 9.20328°E
- Number of locations: 150+ boutiques
- Area served: Worldwide
- Key people: Stefano Secchi (CEO)
- Products: Ready-to-wear; handbags; footwear; fashion accessories; fragrances
- Brands: Moschino; Boutique Moschino; Love Moschino
- Revenue: ▲€215.4 million (2020)
- Parent: Aeffe S.p.A.
- Website: moschino.com

Moschino (Italian pronunciation: [moˈskiːno]) is an Italian luxury fashion house founded in 1983 by Franco Moschino in Milan known for over-the-top, campy designs. The company specializes in ready-to-wear, handbags, and fashion accessories. Moschino's creative director is Adrian Appiolaza.

== History ==
=== Founding and 1990s ===
Franco Moschino was born on 27 February 1950 and raised in Abbiategrasso, Italy. Moschino studied at Accademia di Belle Arti in Milan from 1968 to 1971, at the dismay of his father, who hoped Franco would continue his family's work in the iron industry. While a student, Franco freelanced designs and illustrations for magazines and fashion houses. Upon graduation, Franco worked as a design sketcher for Versace from 1971 to 1977 and designed for Italian fashion house Cadette until 1982. The following year, Franco created "Moschino Couture!", owned by Moonshadow, its Milan-based holding company. Franco gained a reputation for implementing innovative, colorful, and witty designs into his apparel, such incorporating a Roy Lichtenstein pop art piece in a suit and designing a t-shirt featuring a TV tuned to “Channel No. 5" (sparking a lawsuit by Chanel due to the reference to its Chanel No. 5 perfume).

By the late 1980s, Moschino's popularity in Europe had begun to replicate in the United States, with US sales accounting for 15 to 20 percent of business. By the 1990s, Franco became known for his social awareness campaigns and his criticism of the fashion industry. In 1994, Franco expressed desire to develop an ecological line “Nature Friendly Garment”, however Franco died later that year from HIV/AIDS-related causes. In recent times, Moschino has made an effort to combat the HIV/AIDS epidemic through a partnership with Product Red and Nickelodeon, creating a Moschino x SpongeBob collection, bringing awareness to HIV/AIDS and fundraising by donating the collection's proceeds to Project Red.

=== Rossella Jardini, 1994–2013 ===
After Franco's death in 1994, his friend Rossella Jardini became the brand's creative director. Responsible for the brand's image and style, Jardini's whimsical designs fit in nicely with the brand's established eccentricity. While Jardini was creative director, Moschino created outfits and accessories for artists Madonna and Lady Gaga for their world tours and created the opening ceremony outfits for the 2006 Winter Olympics. In 2009, Moschino opened its hotel concept, Maison Moschino.

In 1999, Moschino joined Aeffe S.p.A., an Italian luxury group.

With the F/W 2008–2009 pre-collection, Moschino Jeans changed its name to Love Moschino.

=== Jeremy Scott, 2013–2023 ===
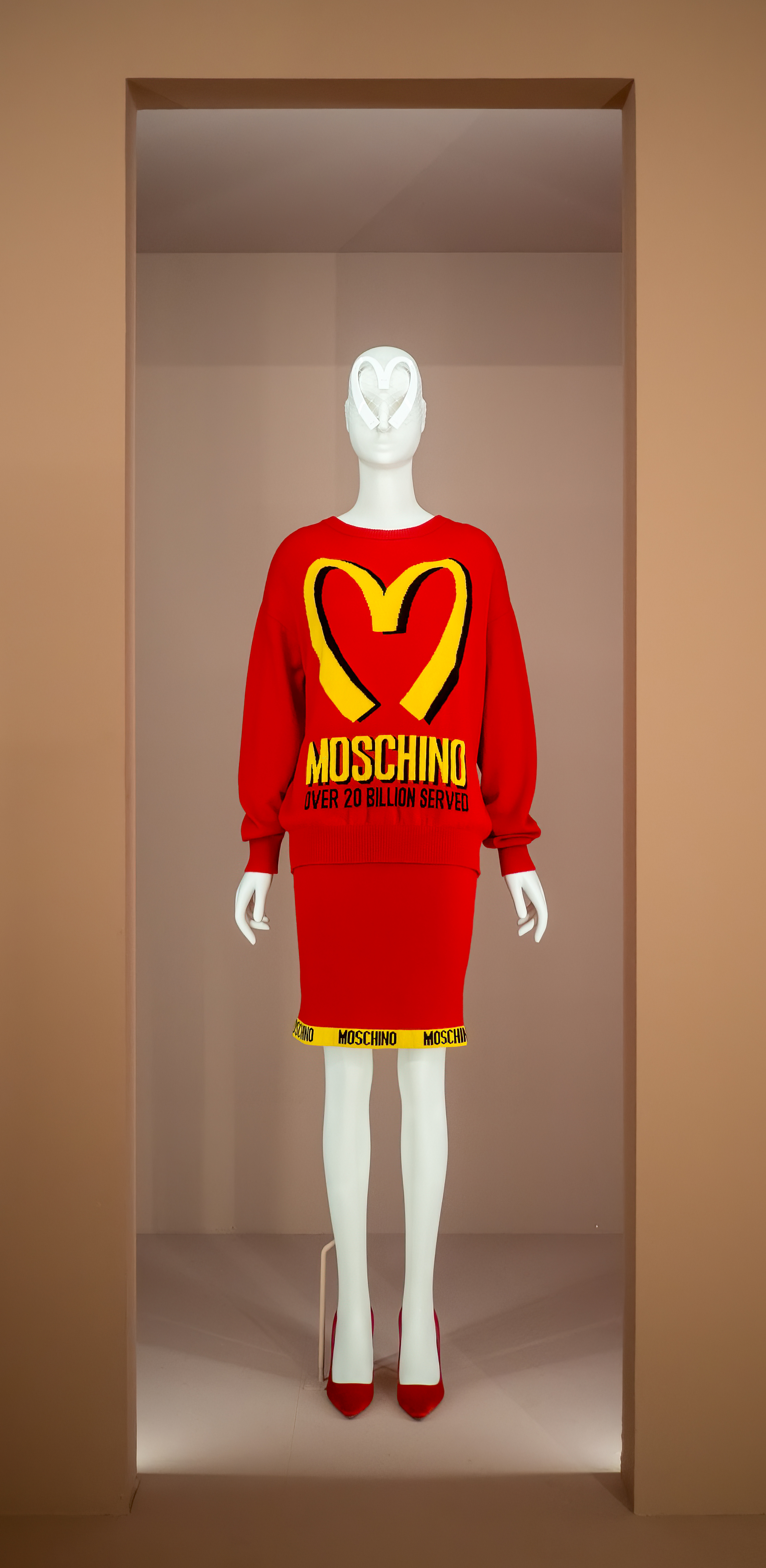
McDonald's-inspired dress from Moschino Fall 2014

In October 2013, Jeremy Scott became Moschino's creative director, debuting his first collection in Fall 2014. Starting in 2014 under Scott's direction, Moschino Cheap and Chic was consolidated into a new women's line—"Boutique Moschino"—established to target a wider array of customers, with a price-point about 40 percent lower than Moschino's mainline.

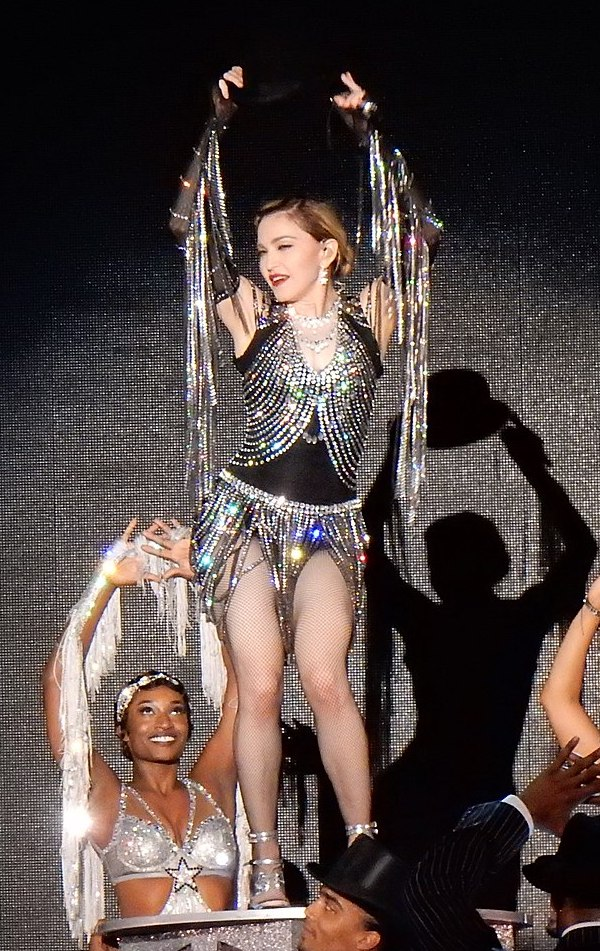
Madonna in Moschino for her Rebel Heart Tour

In 2014, Scott designed a smiley face themed outfit for Katy Perry's world tour and in 2015 designed a black one-piece outfit with Swarovski crystals for Madonna's world tour.

In April 2018, Moschino announced a collaboration with H&M. The following year, Moschino collaborated with EA Games for a Sims 4 collection. The collection featured clothing with pixelated illusions inspired by the computer game.

With the 2019 Met Gala's theme Camp: Notes on Fashion, Katy Perry wore a gown that looked like a chandelier, created by Moschino, and Kacey Musgraves arrived appearing like a life-size Barbie, also by Moschino.

In 2021, Aeffe S.p.A. gained full control of Moschino, by acquiring the remaining 30 percent stake it did not originally own, at the price of 66.6 million euros ($78.51 million).

In March 2023, Scott announced his exit from the creative director position.

=== Davide Renne, 2023 ===
In October 2023, Aeffe announced Davide Renne as the new creative director of Moschino, overseeing the women's and men's lines and accessories. He joined Moschino after a 20-year career at Gucci. He assumed the role on 1 November, but died from a suspected heart attack in Milan nine days later, at the age of 46.

=== Adrian Appiolaza, 2024–2026 ===
In January 2024, Adrian Appiolaza was appointed as the new creative director of Moschino. Prior to his appointment, Appiolaza worked at Loewe for 10 years as womenswear design director under Jonathan Anderson. Appiolaza is a graduate of Central Saint Martins and has also worked at Chloé, Alexander McQueen, and Miu Miu. In June 2026, Appiolaza exited the house. According to Lauren Sherman of Puck he will be replaced by Loris Messina and Simone Rizzo of Sunnei.

=== =Loris Messina and Simone Rizzo. From 2026 ===
In June 2026 Loris Messina and Simone Rizzo, founders of Sunnei, were appointed as co-creative directors of Moschino, succeeding Adrian Appiolaza.

== Advertising ==
For its advertising campaigns, Moschino has been working with renowned photographers including Steven Klein (1990), Steven Meisel (1999, 2014), Patrick Demarchelier (2001–2002), Mario Testino (2003) and Peter Lindbergh (2007).

== Controversy ==
In a 2015 lawsuit, New York-based graffiti artist Rime claimed the Moschino dress worn by Katy Perry at the 2015 Met Gala copied his work. The case was settled in 2016.

In 2016, Nordstrom responded to pressure from consumers and pulled Moschino's pill-themed merchandise from its shelves, amid allegations it trivialized the opioid epidemic.
