= Cassa di Risparmio della Provincia di Viterbo =

Carivit
- Native name: Cassa di Risparmio della Provincia di Viterbo
- Formerly: Cassa di Risparmio di Viterbo
- Type: Società per azioni
- Industry: Financial services
- Founded: 1855 in Viterbo; 1991 (S.p.A.)
- Defunct: 2015
- Fate: absorbed by the parent company
- Successor: Fondazione Carivit (charity); branches of Intesa Sanpaolo
- Headquarters: Viterbo, Italy
- Owner: Banca CR Firenze (75.81%); Fondazione Carivit (11.09%); others (10.20%)
- Parent: Intesa Sanpaolo
- Footnotes mid-2014 data

Cassa di Risparmio della Provincia di Viterbo (Carivit) was an Italian bank and charity organization. The banking business was acquired by Cariplo in 1990s. In 2015 Intesa Sanpaolo completely absorbed the bank.

== History ==
Cassa di Risparmio di Viterbo was found in 1855 in Viterbo in the Papal States. The bank acquired the saving banks in Acquapendente, Bagnoregio and Carbognano in 1927 and Casse di Risparmio Riunite di Ronciglione, Sutri, Capranica e Caprarola in 1937, due to a reform to force small saving banks to merge with a larger one. In the same year the bank was renamed into Cassa di Risparmio della Provincia di Viterbo.

Due to Legge Amato, the bank was split into a limited company (S.p.A.) and a charity organization (Ente Cassa di Risparmio della Provincia di Viterbo). In 1990s Cassa di Risparmio delle Provincie Lombarde (Cariplo) bought 41.1% shares of the S.p.A. In 1997 it was increased to 64.32% and 70.92% in 1998. In the same year Cariplo was merged with Banco Ambrosiano Veneto to form Banca Intesa. In 1999 Casse del Centro became the sub-holding company, which also included saving banks in Rieti (Cariri), Foligno, Città di Castello and Spoleto. In 2004 the sub-holding company increased its ownership ratio to 75.81% (ordinary and preferred shares combined). In December 2008 Banca CR Firenze, another bank from Intesa Sanpaolo Group, became the new sub-holding company by acquiring Casse del Centro from Intesa Sanpaolo.

On 11 December 2014 Intesa Sanpaolo bought the remain 11.09% stake held by the foundation for €18,836,226.32. It was part of the reform of banking foundations, which the Ministry of Economy and Finance forced the foundations to diversify their investments. Despite the historical value of the stake of the bank (€10,742,657) held by the foundation, did not pass the limit of 33% of the total assets (€47,607,996 at 31 December 2013). However, the fair value (and later the sold value) of the stake, €18,836,226.32, was equal to 33.78% of the total assets (€55,759,184) of the organization as at 31 December 2014.

In 2015, Intesa Sanpaolo decided to absorbed Carivit, Cariri and Cariciv (all from Lazio region) into the parent company, in order to simply the company structure. Intesa Sanapolo selling news shares of the company to buy the remain shares of Carivit. As at 31 December 2014 Intesa Sanpaolo owned 11.09% stake directly, and through non-wholly-owned subsidiary Banca CR Firenze for and additional 75.81%; 2.90% were treasury shares and only 10.20% were held by the third parties.

Carivit had a shareholders' equity of €134,298,708 as at 31 December 2014.

== Bank Foundation ==
Fondazione Cassa di Risparmio della Provincia di Viterbo or Fondazione Carivit was a minority shareholders of Cassa Depositi e Prestiti. The foundation had a shareholders' equity of €44,685,856 on 31 December 2014.

== See also ==
- Banca di Viterbo Credito Cooperativo
- List of banks in Italy
