= Fondazione Cariplo =

Charitable foundation in Milan, Italy

- Predecessor: Philanthropic activities of the Cassa di Risparmio delle Provincie Lombarde (founded in 1823)
- Formation: December 1991
- Type: charitable foundation (fondazione di origine bancaria)
- Headquarters: via Daniele Manin 23 – 20121 Milan, Italy.
- Location: Milan, Italy
- General Secretary: Sergio Urbani
- President: Giovanni Fosti
- Budget: €177,612,995 EUR (2023)
- Endowment: €8,207,623,005 EUR (2023)
- Staff: 61
- Website: www.fondazionecariplo.it

Fondazione Cariplo is a charitable foundation in Milan, Italy. It was created in December 1991 when the Amato law, Law no. 218 of 30 July 1990, came into force. Under this law, savings banks were required to separate into a not-for-profit foundation and a commercial banking arm. The Cassa di Risparmio delle Provincie Lombarde, commonly known as Cariplo, was divided into the Fondazione Cariplo and Cariplo SpA, the bank, which merged with Ambroveneto in 1998.

As of December 2023, the organisation had an endowment of €8,207,623,005.

Fondazione Cariplo is part of the Partner Circle of the Foundations Platform F20, which is a global network of foundations and other philanthropic organizations.

== Bank ownership ==
At the end of year 2000, the foundation held 9.87% shares of Banca Intesa (fell from 18.55% circa before the merger of Intesa with Banca Commerciale Italiana) as well as 2.77% shares of Sanpaolo IMI. On 31 December 2006, the day before the merger of Intesa and Sanpaolo, the foundation was the second largest shareholder of Intesa after Crédit Agricole.

After the merger, the foundation fell to the 5th largest shareholder with 4.68% of the shares of Intesa Sanpaolo (on 31 December 2007). However it increased to third largest shareholder on 31 December 2014, after Compagnia di San Paolo (9.506%) and BlackRock (which acted as a fund manager for their client, 4.897%) The three other major shareholders with >2% were Ente Cassa di Risparmio di Firenze 3.248%, and Fondazione Cassa di Risparmio di Padova e Rovigo (4.162%), as well as Norges Bank at 2.032%.

== Other investments ==
Fondazione Cariplo is the largest shareholder (37.65%) of Quaestio Holding, the parent company of Quaestio Capital Management SGR, which is an Italian asset management company. Additionally, Fondazione Cariplo is one of Quaestio's clients, as an investor of QUAMVIS S.C.A., SICAV-FIS – FUND ONE.

== Humanitarian initiatives ==
Fondazione Cariplo is a financial partner of The Europe Challenge, a project supporting library development across 26 European countries. As of 2024, the initiative has funded four projects in Ukraine, implemented by Lviv Municipal Library, Buchach Public Library, Ternopil Regional Universal Scientific Library, and Lesya Ukrainka Public Library in Kyiv.

Fondazione Cariplo allocated over €3.4 million to support humanitarian initiatives in response to Russia's 2022 invasion of Ukraine. Aid was provided in Ukraine's neighbouring countries and in the Italian provinces of Lombardy, Novara, and Verbano-Cusio-Ossola. This included approximately €437,000 for a humanitarian aid initiative by ACRI (the Italian Association of Foundations and Savings Banks), €2 million for refugee assistance through 16 Lombard community foundations, and €1 million for housing support.

== See also ==
- Art collection of Fondazione Cariplo
- Fondazione Cariplo at Google Cultural Institute
