= Giovanni Bazoli =

Italian banker

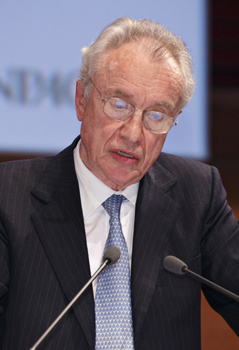
- Born: December 18, 1932 (age 93); Brescia, Italy
- Education: University of Parma, Italy
- Occupations: Professor; banker; lawyer

Giovanni Bazoli (Brescia, 18 December 1932) is an Italian banker. He is honorary chairman of Italian bank Intesa Sanpaolo

== Family ==
Bazoli is the descendant of a well known Brescian family involved in politics since the early twentieth century (his grandfather, Luigi Bazoli, was one of the founders of Italian People's Party in 1919, and his father was a member of the Constituent Assembly).

== Career ==
Bazoli was a professor of Administrative Law and Public Law at the Università Cattolica Milano until retiring from his university career in 2001. While serving as a director of Banca San Paolo di Brescia in 1982, then Treasury Minister Nino Andreatta asked him to contribute to the bailout of Banco Ambrosiano, the Italian bank overwhelmed by the Calvi scandal. He became chairman of Nuovo Banco Ambrosiano and managed the sale of Rizzoli-Corriere della Sera (now RCS MediaGroup), the market-leading editorial group that Angelo Rizzoli had sold to Calvi. At the time, Rizzoli-Corriere della Sera was Italy's largest editorial group. As chairman of Mittel, one of the companies that took part in the acquisition of Rizzoli-Corriere della Sera, he benefited personally from the transaction. He merged Nuovo Banco with Banca Cattolica del Veneto, forming Banco Ambrosiano Veneto (BAV). In 1990, he was instrumental in getting the French group Crédit Agricole to become one of BAV's shareholders, thereby thwarting Gemina’s attempt to take on a leading role in the bank. The 1997 merger of BAV and Cariplo led to the creation of Banca Intesa, with Bazoli becoming the new bank's chairman. In later years, Banca Intesa merged with Banca Commerciale Italiana (1999) and Sanpaolo IMI (2007), thus creating the current Intesa Sanpaolo.

=== Current appointments ===
- Intesa Sanpaolo – Honorary Chairman
- Fondazione Giorgio Cini – Chairman
- Editrice La Scuola S.p.A. – Deputy Chairman
- UBI Banca S.p.A. – Member of Supervisory board
- Associazione Bancaria Italiana – Director and member of the Executive Committee
- Biblioteca Ambrosiana – Member of "Congregazione dei Conservatori"
- RCS Quotidiani S.p.A. – Director
- Fondazione Eni Enrico Mattei – Director
- FAI Fondo per l’Ambiente Italiano – Member of “Comitato dei Garanti”

== Personal life ==
Bazoli is also known for his passion for biblical studies and for his center-left political leanings. According to media sources, Bazoli is said to have declined an offer to run as leader of the Ulivo coalition in the 2001 political elections, a role then taken on by Francesco Rutelli. He is married to Elena Whurer and they have four children.

== Honour ==
- Italy: Knight Grand Cross of the Order of Merit of the Italian Republic (27 December 2000)
