= Cassa di Risparmio di Foligno =

Italian bank

- Native name: Cassa di Risparmio di Foligno S.p.A.
- Type: Subsidiary of a listed company
- Industry: Financial services
- Founded: 1857; 1992 (spin-off)
- Defunct: 2012
- Fate: Merged to form Casse dell'Umbria
- Successor: Fondazione CariFoligno (charity activities); Casse Umbria (banking activities)
- Headquarters: Foligno, Italy
- Services: Retail, commercial and private banking

Cassa di Risparmio di Foligno, or Carifol in short, is a former Italian regional bank based in Foligno, Umbria. A subsidiary of Intesa Sanpaolo, the bank was merged with 3 other saving banks in Umbria to form Casse di Risparmio dell'Umbria in 2012.

== History ==
Found 1857 in Foligno, Papal States, the bank had a philanthropic mission to operate a mount of piety and a saving bank (Italian: Cassa di Risparmio).

=== Cariplo ===
In 1992, due to Legge Amato, the daily banking operation, charity and ownership were separated into a società per azioni and Fondazione Cassa di Risparmio di Foligno (a banking foundation). Cassa di Risparmio delle Provincie Lombarde also immediately acquired 20% stake in the new limited company. The stake was diluted to 18.34% in 1996.

=== Banca Intesa ===
In July 1999 Banca Intesa the successor of Cariplo, acquired an additional 47.1% ownership from the foundation (reached 70.47% at the end of year 1999), as well as grouped 4 other saving banks in Central Italy (2 from Umbria, 2 from Lazio) to one intermediate holding company Holding Intesa Centro (which 97.63% stake of the holding was held by Intesa and the 3 banking foundations (except the Carivit Foundation) held the rest). In 2001, Ascoli was added into the mini-group, followed by Terni and Narni in 2003.

In 2007, Carifol followed the ultimate holding company to become part of Intesa Sanpaolo Group. In 2008 the group acquired Banca CR Firenze. Intesa Sanapolo sold the shares of Casse del Centro (ex-Holding Intesa Centro) to Banca CR Firenze, making the Florence bank becoming the new intermediate holding company.

=== merger ===
In 2012 Carifol and 3 former member of "Casse" Central Holding, Città di Castello, Spoleto and Terni and Narni to become part of Casse di Risparmio dell'Umbria. (3 of them from the Province of Perugia and one of them from the Province of Terni). As part of the deal, Intesa also bought the remain shares from the foundations. Prior to the merger, Banca CR Firenze reached 70.529% ownership ratio on Carifol in 2010 and purchased an additional 21.23% (7,233,756 of 34,078,500 total shares) from the foundation for €27,271,260.12 in 2012, as well as 4.59% (1,565,100 of 34,078,500 total shares) from minority shareholder for about €5.9 million.

== Sponsorship ==
The bank was a sponsor of Foligno Calcio.

== See also ==
- Banca dell'Umbria, former Cassa di Risparmio of Perugia, Umbria, a defunct subsidiary of UniCredit
