= Cassa di Risparmio di Biella e Vercelli =

Italian bank

BiverBanca
- BiverBanca logo
- Native name: Cassa di Risparmio di Biella e Vercelli S.p.A.
- Company type: subsidiary of a private company in S.p.A. legal form
- Industry: Financial services
- Predecessor: Cassa di Risparmio di Biella S.p.A. Cassa di Risparmio di Vercelli S.p.A.
- Founded: 1856 (C.R. Biella); 1994 (BiverBanca)
- Headquarters: 15 Via Carso, Biella, Italy
- Number of locations: 121 (2015)
- Area served: Piedmont Region; Region of Aosta Valley; Milan, Lombardy
- Key people: Aldo Pia (president); Massimo Mossino (general manager)
- Services: Retail banking
- Net income: ▲€12,207,140 (2015)
- Total assets: ▼€3,682,489,673 (2015)
- Total equity: ▲€382,052,867 (2015)
- Owner: Banca di Asti S.p.A. (60.42%); C.R. Biella Foundation (33.44%); C.R. Vercelli Foundation (6.14%)
- Number of employees: ▼642 (2015)
- Parent: Banca di Asti S.p.A.
- Capital ratio: ▲18.38% (CET1, December 2015)
- Website: www.biverbanca.it
- Footnotes / references in separate financial statements

Cassa di Risparmio di Biella e Vercelli S.p.A. known as BiverBanca, is an Italian saving bank based in Biella, Piedmont. It was acquired by fellow Piedmontese bank Cassa di Risparmio di Asti from Banca Monte dei Paschi di Siena in 2012. BiverBanca had almost all the branches in Piedmont and Aosta Valley, especially in the area around Biella and Vercelli : 46 branches in the Province of Biella (11 alone in Biella) and 46 branches in the Province of Vercelli (8 alone in Vercelli), 10 in Turin and 6 in the Province Novara; 3 in the Province of Alessandria; 5 branches in Aosta Valley; 1 branch in the Province of Verbano-Cusio-Ossola, and lastly 1 branch in Milan, the financial hub of Italy.

The bank did not serve the Province of Asti, which was served by the parent company instead, as well as the Province of Cuneo, Piedmont.

== Timeline ==
- 1994 Cassa di Risparmio di Biella merged with Cassa di Risparmio di Vercelli to form Cassa di Risparmio di Biella e Vercelli (BiverBanca) C.R. Vercelli Foundation held 26.2% stake and C.R. Biella Foundation held 73.8% stake
- 1997 Banca Commerciale Italiana acquired 55% shares from the banking foundations
- 1999 Became part of Banca Intesa Group
- 2007 Acquired by Banca Monte dei Paschi di Siena (BMPS) from Intesa Sanpaolo (55%) for about €399 million; C.R. Biella Foundation retained 33.22% and C.R. Vercelli Foundation 11.78%
- 2008 Re-capitalization, BMPS held 59%, C.R. Biella Foundation held 35% and C.R. Vercelli Foundation held 6%
- 2010 Acquired branches from sister bank Banca Antonveneta; new ownership ratio changed to BMPS (60.42%), C.R. Biella Foundation 33.44% and C.R. Vercelli Foundation 6.14%.
- 2012 Acquired by Cassa di Risparmio di Asti from BMPS for about €205.5 million (for 60.42% stake)

== See also ==
other saving bank from the provincial capital of Piedmont

- Cassa di Risparmio di Alessandria, now part of Banco BPM
- Cassa di Risparmio di Cuneo, now part of UBI Banca
- Cassa di Risparmio di Torino, now part of UniCredit
