= Tritons' Fountain (Milan) =

Fountain in Milan, Italy

- Fontana dei Tritoni (Italian)
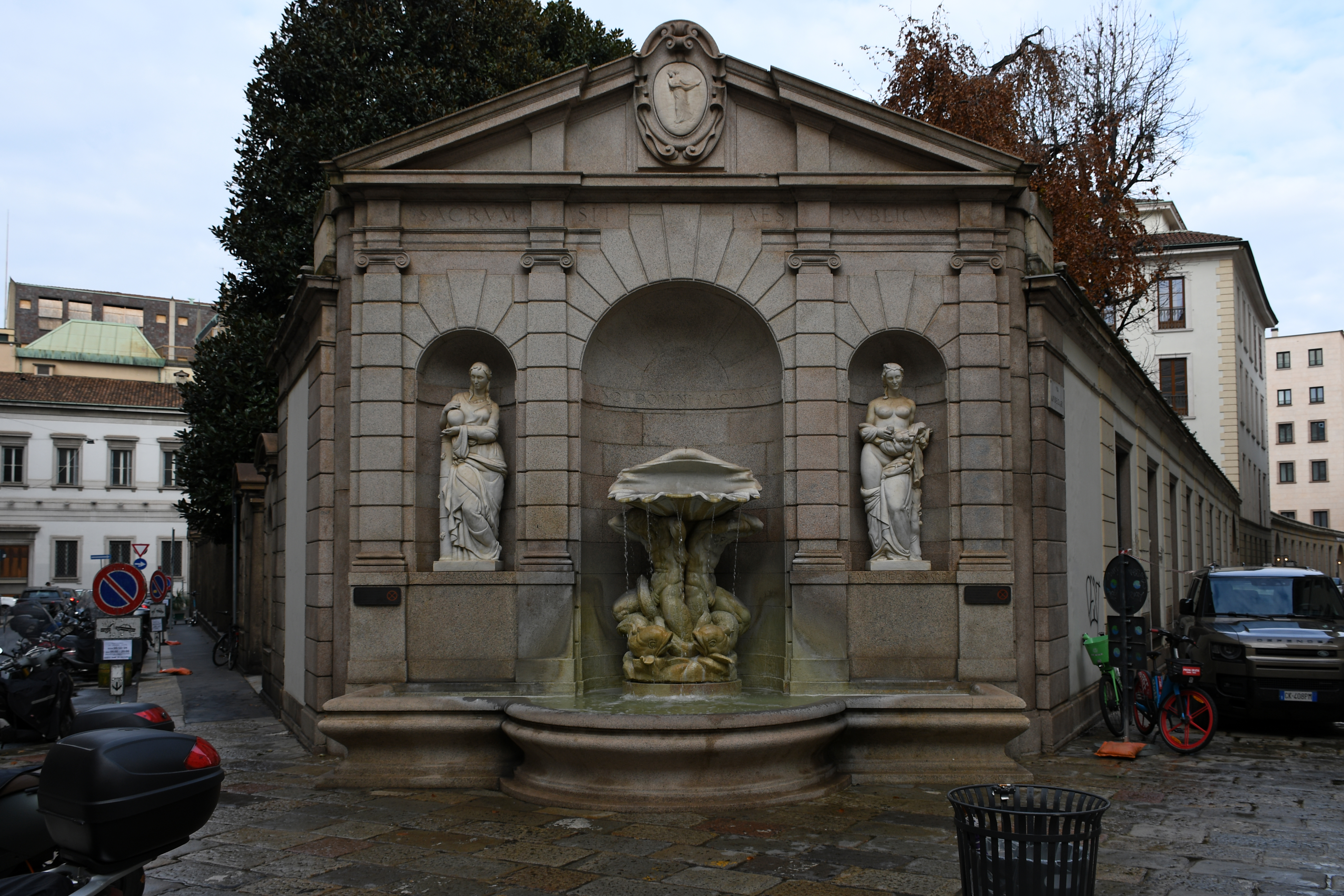
- The Tritons' Fountain in 2024
- Year: 1928
- Location: Milan; 45.4688°N 9.1902°E

The Tritons' Fountain (Italian: Fontana dei Tritoni) is a fountain located in Milan, Italy.

== History ==
The fountain, completed in 1928, was designed by architect Alessandro Minali and sculpted by Salvatore Saponaro. It was commissioned as a decorative feature by the Cassa di Risparmio delle Provincie Lombarde and built along the boundary wall of Palazzo Confalonieri, which was owned by the institution.

== Description ==
The fountain, located at the intersection of Via Andegari and Via Romagnosi in central Milan, features a small central basin with two tritons, flanked by two allegorical sculptures. On the left is Saving, depicted with a money box and accompanied by the Latin inscription tute servare (“to keep safe”); on the right is Charity, represented with a basket of fruit and the inscription munifice donare (“to give generously”).

== Gallery ==
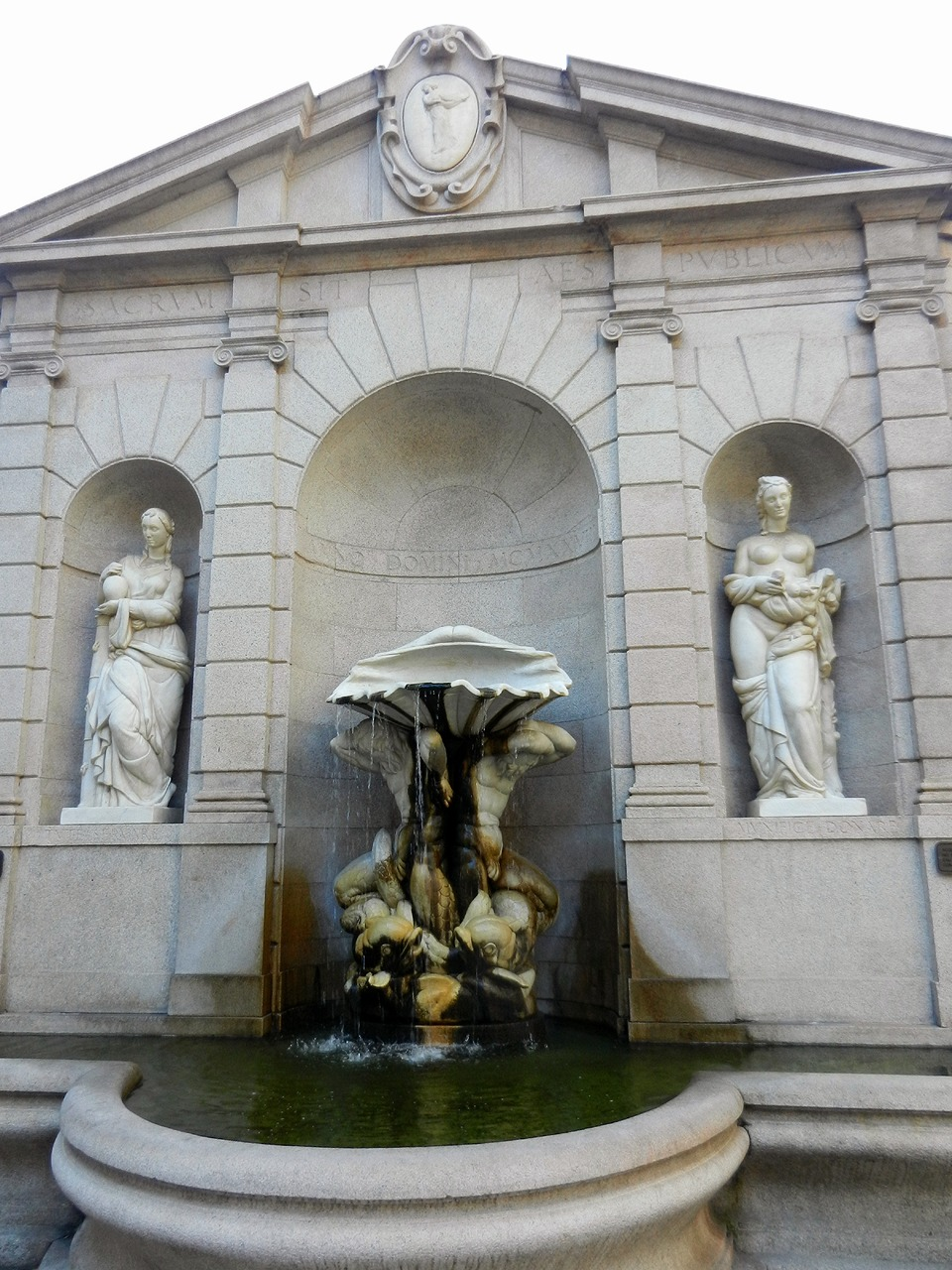

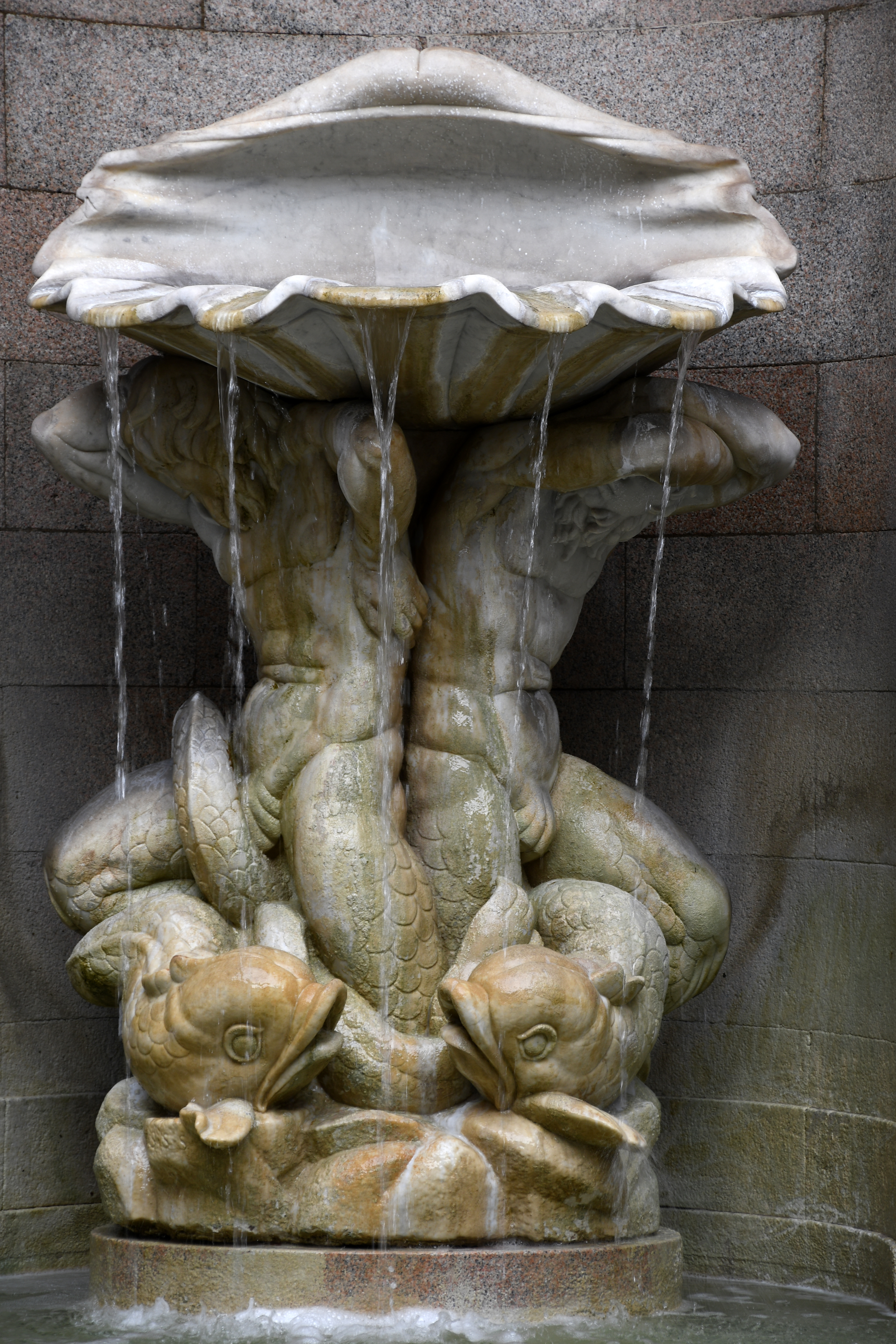

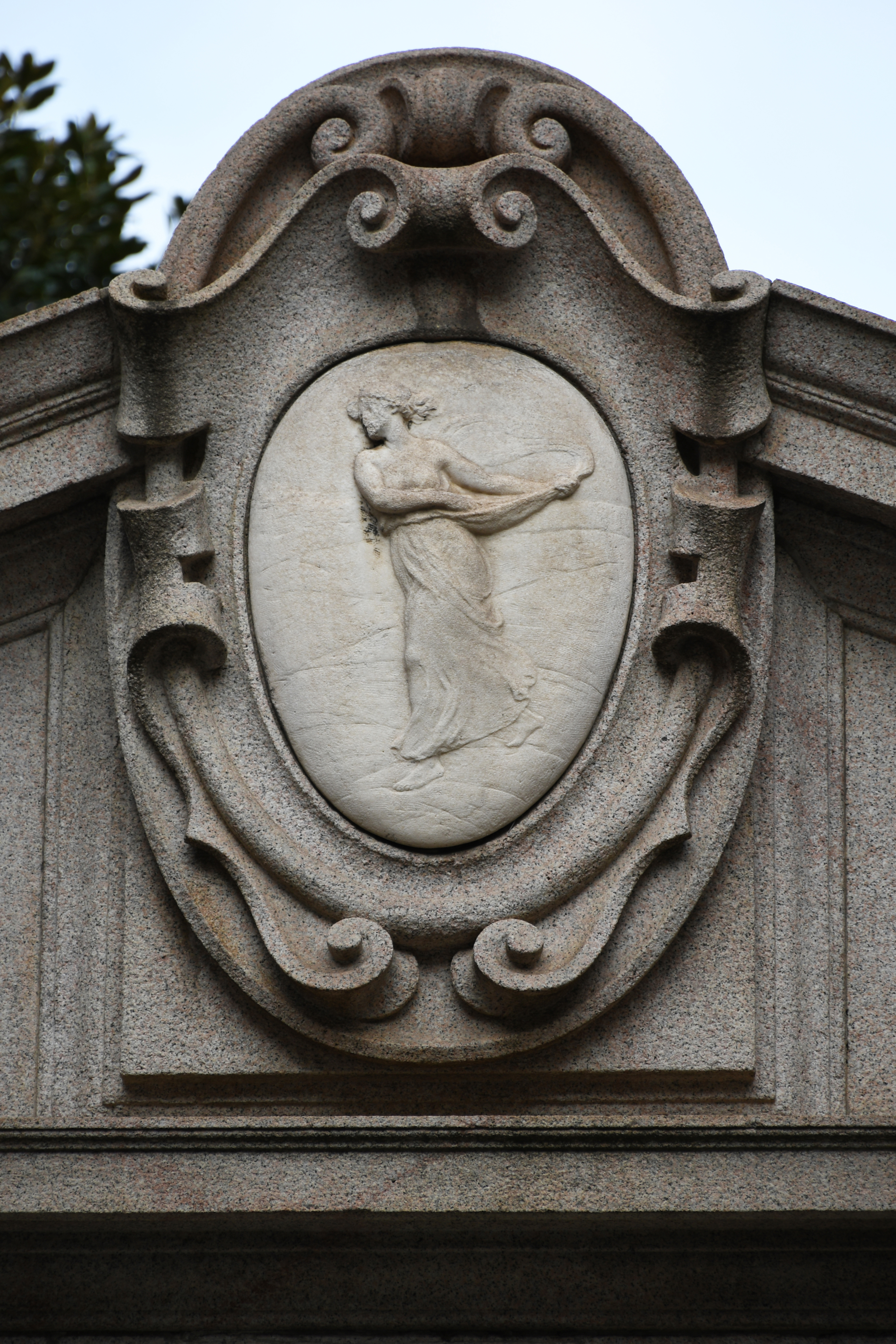
