= Cassa di Risparmio di Vercelli =

Italian retail bank and charity organization

C.R. Vercelli
- Native name: Cassa di Risparmio di Vercelli
- Industry: Financial services
- Founded: 1851; 1991 (S.p.A. and Fondazione)
- Defunct: 1994 (S.p.A. only)
- Fate: merger (S.p.A. only)
- Successor: Biverbanca; Fondazione C.R. Vercelli
- Headquarters: Vercelli, Italy

Cassa di Risparmio di Vercelli was an Italian retail bank and charity organization, based in Vercelli, Piedmont. In 1991 it was split into Cassa di Risparmio di Vercelli S.p.A. and Fondazione Cassa di Risparmio di Vercelli. The former was merged with another Piedmontese bank Cassa di Risparmio di Biella in 1994.

== Bank ==
Cassa di Risparmio della Città e Provincia di Vercelli was formed by the royal decree on 19 August 1851. Due to Legge Amato, it was split into Cassa di Risparmio di Vercelli S.p.A. and Fondazione Cassa di Risparmio di Vercelli on 23 December 1991 (gazetted on 24 January 1992). In late 1994, the company was merged with Cassa di Risparmio di Biella, in a ratio of 26.2% (Vercelli) and 73.8% (Biella).

== Banking foundation ==
Fondazione Cassa di Risparmio di Vercelli was the owner of all of the share capital of the bank in 1992, for 35 billion lire par value. However, after the merger with C.R. Biella, the foundation only owned 26.2% of 235 billion lire share capital of Cassa di Risparmio di Biella e Vercelli (BiverBanca). The foundation further reduced the ownership as their investment in 1997 by selling around 14.4% shares of the bank to Banca Commerciale Italiana. After 2008 recapitalization of the bank, the foundation further reduced to own about 6% shares of the bank only.

As of 31 December 2014, the foundation had a minority ownership in Cassa Depositi e Prestiti, CDP Reti and BiverBanca. It had a shareholders' equity of €114,600,761.

== See also ==
- Cassa di Risparmio di Asti
- Cassa di Risparmio di Alessandria, now part of Banca Popolare di Milano
- Cassa di Risparmio di Cuneo, now part of UBI Banca
- Cassa di Risparmio di Torino, now part of UniCredit
- List of banks in Italy
