= Ca' de Sass =

19th-century building in Milan, Italy

Coordinates: 45°28′10″N 9°11′22″E

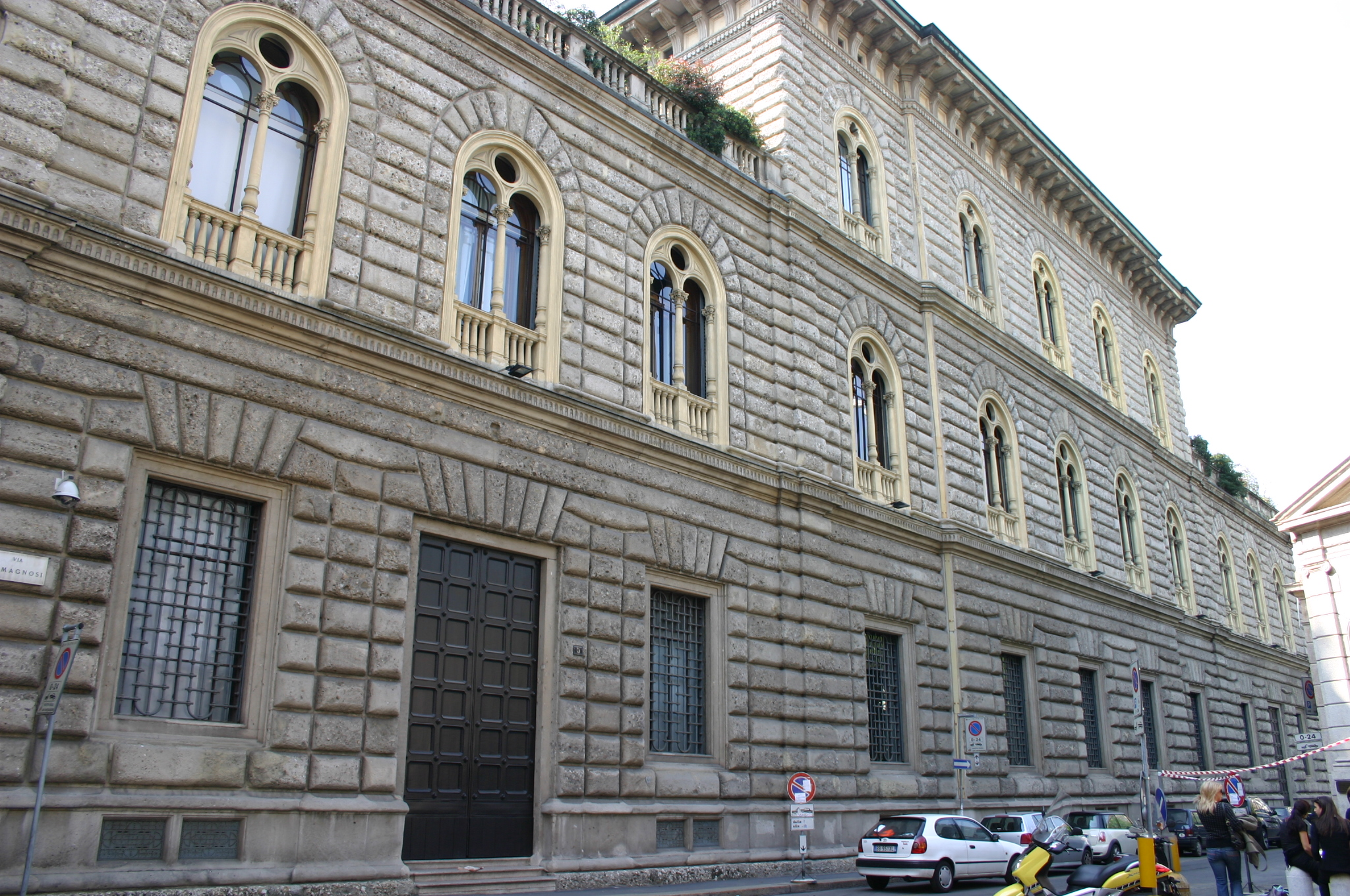
- Facade of Ca' de Sass
- Interactive map of the Ca' de Sass area

General information
- Location: 6 and 8, Via Monte di Pietà, Milan, Italy
- Current tenants: Intesa Sanpaolo
- Construction started: 1868
- Construction stopped: 1872
- Opened: 19th-century

Design and construction
- Architect: Giuseppe Balzaretto

The Ca' de Sass (Lombard name; literally "house of stone") is a monumental 19th century building in Milan, Italy. Located in the city centre, at 6 and 8 of Via Monte di Pietà, is the headquarters of Intesa Sanpaolo, the largest Italian banking group. It used to be the headquarters of Cariplo, an Italian bank that has since merged with Banca Commerciale Italiana into Banca Intesa and, later with Sanpaolo IMI, to create Intesa Sanpaolo Group.

The design of the building by architect Giuseppe Balzaretto, began in 1868. Balzaretto's design was largely inspired by the architecture of Palazzo Strozzi in Florence, and by Renaissance bank buildings in general. Construction of the building was completed in 1872.

The external walls of the buildings are rusticated, with mullions and terraces.
