= Všeobecná Úverová Banka =

Retail and commercial bank domiciled in Slovakia

Všeobecná úverová banka, a.s. abbreviated: VUB

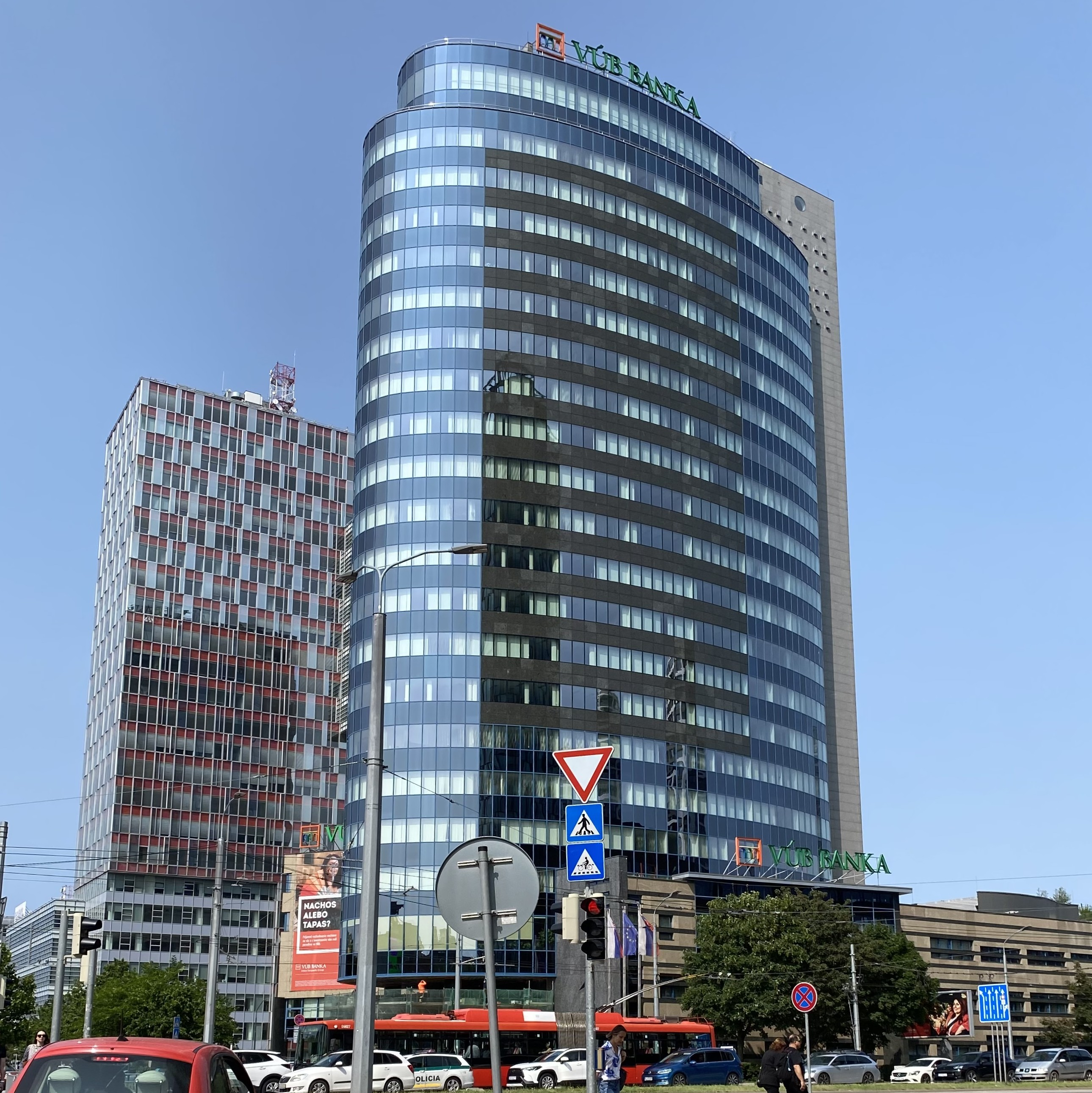
- VUB Headquarters in Bratislava
- Company type: Joint Stock Company
- Industry: Banking, Financial services
- Founded: 1 January 1990
- Headquarters: Mlynske nivy 1 Bratislava 829 90
- Area served: Slovakia
- Key people: Alexander Resch (CEO and Chairman of the Management Board)
- Services: Credit cards, retail banking, corporate banking, investment banking
- Net income: ▲135 096 000 EUR (2013)
- Total assets: ▲11 151 378 000 EUR (2013)
- Owner: Intesa Sanpaolo (96.97%)
- Number of employees: 3,742 (2019)
- Subsidiaries: VÚB Factoring, a.s; VÚB Generali, d.s.s, a.s; Consumer Finance Holding, a.s.; VÚB Leasing, a. s.; VÚB Asset Management; sprav.spol.a.s.
- Website: www.vub.sk
- Footnotes / references: Bank code: 0200; Bank identification: SUBA; SWIFT (BIC) code: SUBASKBX

Všeobecná úverová banka, a.s. (abbreviated as “VUB“ or “The Bank“) is a retail and commercial bank domiciled in Slovakia with its registered office at Mlynske Nivy 1, Bratislava. The Italian banking group Intesa Sanpaolo is the majority shareholder of VUB, holding a 96.97% stake.

The bank was acquired by the predecessor of Intesa Sanpaolo, Banca Intesa in 2001.

As of 31 December 2013, the bank had a network of 244 points of sale (including Retail Branches, Corporate Branches, and Mortgage Centres across Slovakia. The Bank has also one branch in the Czech Republic.

== Subsidiaries ==
VÚB Factoring was established as the first factoring company in Slovakia and presently is one of the largest in the market.

VUB Generali d.s.s., a.s. was founded in 2005 by VUB and Generali Poisťovňa (insurance company) as a joint venture in pension saving. The company offers services related to the establishment and administration of pension funds for the purposes of the Old Age Pension Savings (so-called Second Pillar of Pension Scheme).

Consumer Finance Holding, a.s. was established in 2005 as an administrator of a group of financial companies providing consumer non-banking loans, installment and catalogue sales, and leasing of used cars. The company was created by a merger of the following companies: Quatro, a.s., TatraCredit, a.s., Q-Car, a.s., Q-Broker, a.s, Slovenská požičovňa, a.s. and Slovenské kreditné karty, a.s.

VÚB Leasing, a.s. is a universal lease company offering a wide range of financial products. In addition to financial lease services, the company also provides operational lease and installment sale financing.

VÚB Asset Management, správ.spol. a.s., registered on 17 April 2000. The core activity of the business is to collect cash from the public with the aim of investing it in mutual funds

== See also ==
- List of banks in Slovakia
