= Intesa Sanpaolo =

Italian banking group

Intesa Sanpaolo S.p.A.

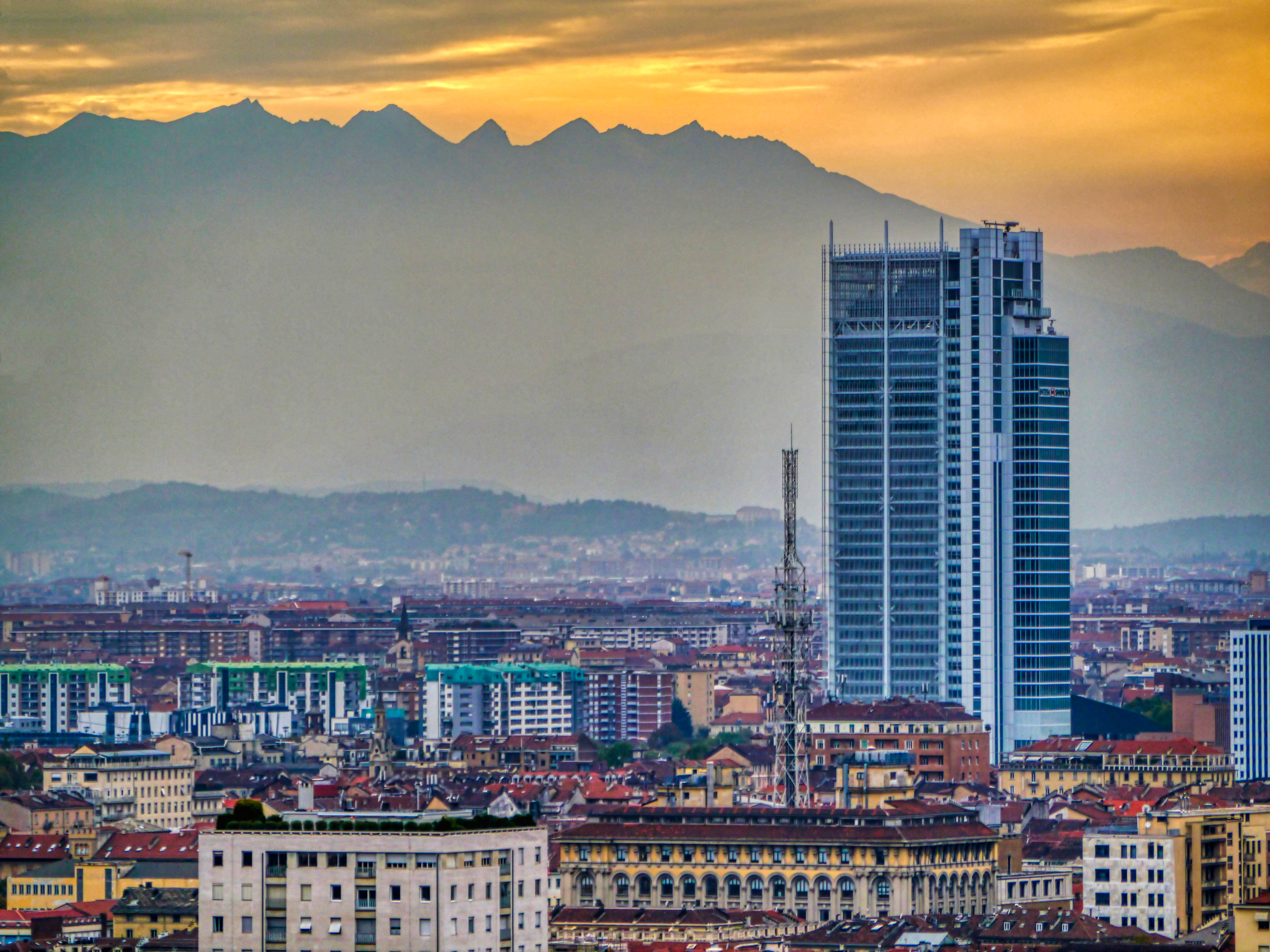
- Headquarters building in Turin
- Type: Public
- Traded as: BIT: ISP; FTSE MIB Component
- ISIN: IT0000072618
- Industry: Financial services
- Predecessors: Banca Intesa; Sanpaolo IMI
- Founded: January 2007; 19 years ago (merger)
- Headquarters: Grattacielo Intesa Sanpaolo, Turin, Italy; Ca' de Sass, Milan, Italy
- Number of locations: 4,565 branches; 3,611 in Italy; 954 abroad
- Areas served: Italy; Central-Eastern Europe; Egypt
- Key people: Gian Maria Gros-Pietro (chairman); Carlo Messina (CEO)
- Products: Asset management; Banking; Commodities; Credit cards; Equities trading; Insurance; Investment management; Mortgage loans; Mutual funds; Exchange-traded funds; Index funds; Private equity; Risk management; Wealth management
- Operating income: ▲€21.27 billion (2025)
- Net income: ▲€9.32 billion (2025)
- AUM: ▲€562 billion (2025)
- Total assets: ▲€960 billion (2025)
- Total equity: ▲€65.2 billion (2025)
- Owner: Fondazione Compagnia di San Paolo (6.5%); Fondazione Cariplo (5.26%)
- Number of employees: ▼90,831 (2025)
- Subsidiaries: isybank
- Capital ratio: ▼13.2% (2025)
Rating
A-	(Fitch, 2025)
A3	(Moody's, 2025)
BBB+	(S&P, 2025)
- Website: www.intesasanpaolo.com

Intesa Sanpaolo S.p.A. is an Italian international banking group. It is Italy's largest bank by total assets and the world's 38th largest. It was formed through the merger of the Milan-based Banca Intesa and Turin-based Sanpaolo IMI in 2007, but has a corporate identity stretching back to its first foundation as Istituto Bancario San Paolo di Torino in 1583. It has two headquarters: Milan, which houses the headquarters of IMI-Corporate and Investment Banking Division, International Banks Division, Private Banking Division, Asset Management Division and Insurance Division, and Turin, which houses Banca dei Territori, the retail banking Division.

As of 2025, the bank served approximately 14 million customers in Italy and 7.5 million customers in Central and Southeast Europe, the Middle East and Northern Africa through several subsidiaries such as Alexbank, CIB Bank, PBZ and VÚB Banka. By 2025, its assets had grown to US$1.011 trillion, ranking 40th for that metric in the Fortune Global 500 and 283rd overall. The company is a component of the Euro Stoxx 50 stock market index.

Intesa Sanpaolo has been designated as a Significant Institution since the entry into force of European Banking Supervision in late 2014, and as a consequence is directly supervised by the European Central Bank. As of January 2025, Intesa Sanpaolo had a market cap of US$73 billion.

== History ==
Banca Intesa and Sanpaolo IMI, the two banks that merged in 2007 to create Intesa Sanpaolo, were themselves the product of many mergers. Cariplo and Banco Ambrosiano Veneto merged in 1998 to form Banca Intesa. The following year, Banca Commerciale Italiana joined the group. In 1998, Sanpaolo IMI emerged from the merger of Istituto Bancario San Paolo di Torino, which specialized in retail banking, and IMI (Istituto Mobiliare Italiano), an investment bank.

=== Banca Intesa ===
The oldest part of the banking group is Cariplo S.p.A., which traces its roots to the Austrian Empire household savings bank Cassa di Risparmio delle Provincie Lombarde which was established in 1823 in Milan. The cassa di risparmio was started by an Italian philanthropic group, the Central Committee of Charity; a response by the government to the hard economic times of the early 19th century. In the early 20th century, the bank helped Italian companies in the North obtain capital during and after World Wars 1 and 2, chiefly under the guidance of Giordano Dell'Amore. Banking reforms in 1990 started by Giuliano Amato (Amato Law; Legge Amato) led to the restructuring/reorganization of banks by forcing the government to relinquish control of them (the result was a more market-driven bank that focused less on social programs/social causes were abandoned).

Cariplo S.p.A was formed in 1991, when Cassa di Risparmio delle Provincie Lombarde (sold by Ente Cassa di Risparmio delle Provincie Lombarde) merged with its subsidiary IBI. Banco Ambrosiano Veneto originated with Nuovo Banco Ambrosiano and Banca Cattolica del Veneto which merged in 1989. The bank increased in size during the 1990s due to numerous acquisitions (Citibank Italia, Banca Vallone di Galatina and European securities dealer Caboto, among others).

==== Banca Commerciale Italiana ====
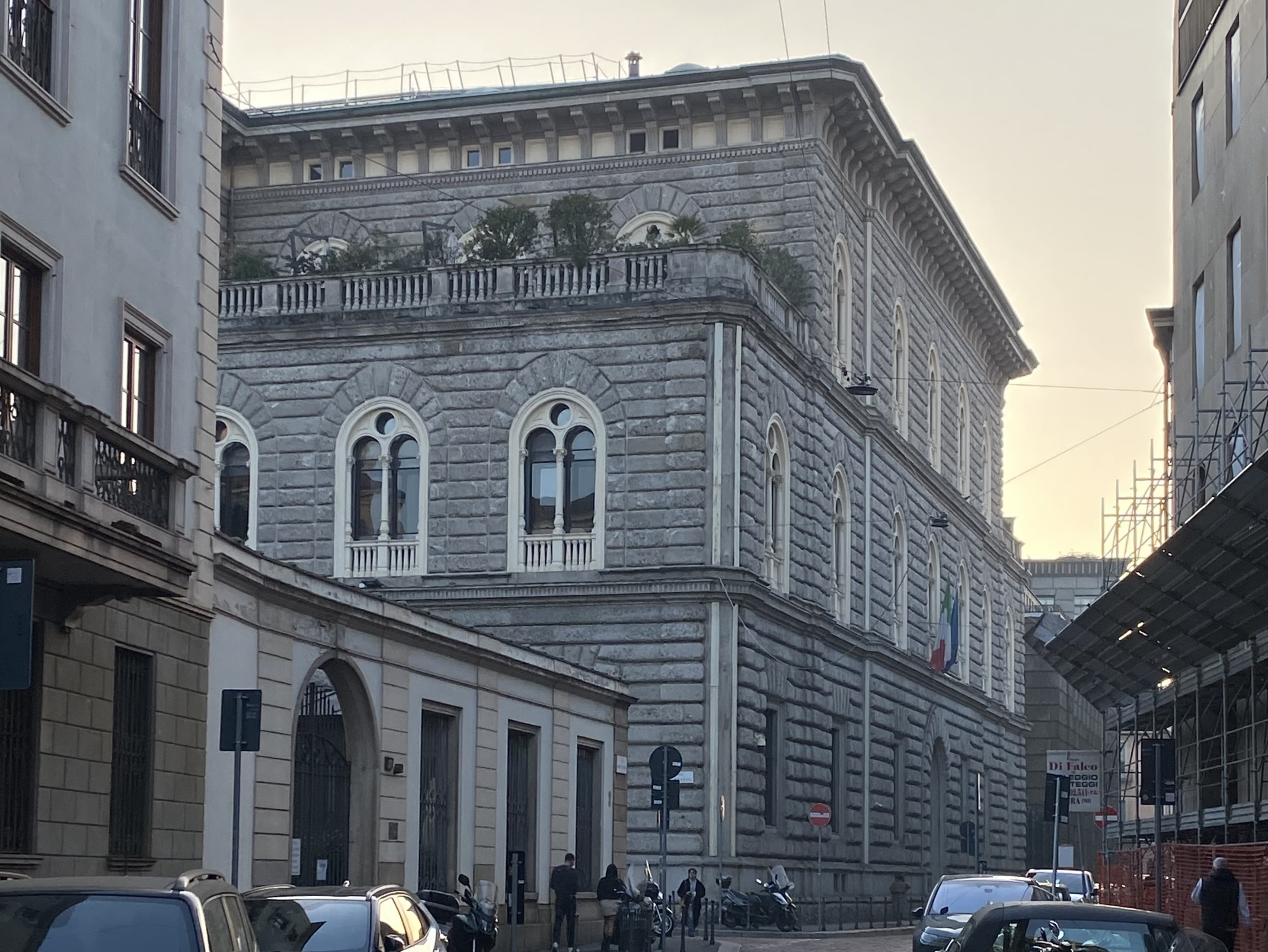
Ca' de Sass, Intesa Sanpaolo headquarters in Milan

Banca Commerciale Italiana (BCI) started in 1894 as a corporate loans lender operating in the commercial industry of Northern Italy. In 1994, Mediobanca purchased an interest in BCI (ironically, BCI was one of the 3 banks that formed Mediobanca almost 50 years earlier). BCI tried to acquire Banco Ambrosiano Veneto the same year but was spurned by shareholders who wouldn't accept the US$1.13 billion offer. In 1999 Italy's largest bank Unicredit Group at the time, attempted a hostile takeover of BCI but failed due to Mediobanca's interest in the company (Mediobanca wanted to merge Banca di Roma with BCI). BCI merged with the former Banco Ambrosiano and Cariplo in 1998 to form a financial institution renamed Banca Intesa in 2003.

=== Sanpaolo IMI ===
Sanpaolo IMI was formed in 1998 when Istituto Bancario San Paolo di Torino (founded in 1563) and Istituto Mobiliare Italiano (IMI) merged, (IMI itself was established in 1931) in a US 37.8 billion dollar deal.

=== Intesa Sanpaolo ===
In January 2007, Banca Intesa and Sanpaolo IMI, two of the three largest banks in Italy, officially merged. As part of the authorization of the merger, the Italian Competition Authority (AGCM) forbid Intesa Sanpaolo to open any new branches for two years in the provinces of Udine and Gorizia (Friuli – Venezia Giulia region), provinces of Rovigo and Padua (Veneto region), Aosta Valley, provinces of Biella and Alessandria (Piedmont region), Province of Bolzano (South Tyrol), Province of Bologna (Emilia-Romagna region), Province of Pavia (Lombardy region), Province of Naples (Campania region), Province of Imperia (Liguria region), provinces of Sassari and Cagliari (Sardinia Island), Province of Rieti (Lazio region), province of Terni (Umbria region), Province of Pesaro-Urbino (Marche region), Province of Pescara (Abruzzo region) and Province of Catanzaro (Calabria region). The French banking group Crédit Agricole started to spin off from Intesa Sanpaolo, by acquiring Cariparma, FriulAdria in 2007 and Carispezia in 2011, as well as branches from Intesa Sanpaolo. In 2012, Crédit Agricole sold all the shares of Intesa Sanpaolo.

In December 2007, Cassa di Risparmio di Biella e Vercelli was also sold to Banca Monte dei Paschi di Siena for €399 million. In 2008, Intesa Sanpaolo acquired Banca CR Firenze. In December 2008, Cassa di Risparmio di Fano was sold to Credito Valtellinese. In 2009, group acquisitions included a 30% interest in business info company MF Honyvem, and an increased stake in Alitalia – Compagnia Aerea Italiana up to 33.3% Even though the bank was rumoured to have been working with the government to keep Air France from acquiring a stake in Alitalia, Air France eventually acquired 25%. Alitalia – Compagnia Aerea Italiana sold part of its stake in the airline to Etihad Airways in 2015.

From 2012 to 2013, Intesa Sanpaolo wrote down the value of the investment in Banca delle Marche (a minority interest of 5.84% share capital) for a total of €90 million (€18 + 72 million), as well as €26 million for a minority stake in Cassa di Risparmio della Provincia di Chieti in 2014. The shareholders of the banks were bailed-in in the rescue plan in 2015.

In 2014, Cassa di Risparmio di Venezia and Banca di Credito Sardo were absorbed into Intesa Sanpaolo. The 2014–17 business plan of the bank stated that the banking group would simplify their legal structure. In 2015, local banks Banca Monte Parma, Banca di Trento e Bolzano, Cassa di Risparmio di Civitavecchia, Cassa di Risparmio di Rieti and Cassa di Risparmio della Provincia di Viterbo were absorbed into Intesa Sanpaolo. Banca dell'Adriatico and Casse di Risparmio dell'Umbria were planned to be absorb by Intesa Sanpaolo in mid-2016. A unified website was also used for the remaining retail banks of the group in 2016.

From 2016 to 2017, the banking group also sold their non-core businesses, such as the 0.49% ordinary shares of Visa Europe in cash plus share deal; Intesa Sanpaolo Card and subsidiary Setefi to Mercury (the parent company of Istituto Centrale delle Banche Popolari Italiane) for €1.035 billion and 4.88% shares of Bank of Italy to the bank's shareholders Compagnia di San Paolo, Fondazione Cariplo and the pension funds of the group for €366 million.

On 26 June 2017, as part of a government-funded bailout of the depositors (and the bail-in of the investors of the failed banks), Intesa Sanpaolo acquired the good assets of Banca Popolare di Vicenza (BPVi) and Veneto Banca, including some of the subsidiaries such as Banca Apulia and Banca Nuova. The branches of BPVi and Veneto Banca would at first become branches of Intesa Sanpaolo, but some of them would be closed down in the near future for efficiency, as Intesa Sanpaolo was also one of the major banks in the Veneto region which the failed banks were based. In October 2017, the plan to absorb Banca Nuova into Intesa Sanpaolo was also announced. In December 2017, the plan to absorb Cassa di Risparmio del Friuli Venezia Giulia was announced.

On 6 February 2018, 10 further mergers were announced in the 2018–2021 business plan: Banco di Napoli. Banca CR Firenze, CR Pistoia e della Lucchesia, CR Veneto, Carisbo, Cariromagna, Banca Apulia, Banca IMI, Banca Prossima and Mediocredito Italiano. On 17 February 2020, Carlo Messina unexpectedly announced the launch of a voluntary OPS (public exchange offer) for 4.9 billion euros towards UBI Banca, which provided for the delivery of 17 Intesa Sanpaolo shares for every 10 UBI Banca shares newly issued with a premium of 27.6% compared to the stock market listing on Friday, 14 February. In addition, on 27 April 2020, Intesa, which has access to three million UBI customers, obtained from the extraordinary shareholders' meeting the approval of a capital increase in support of the takeover bid.

The operation is complex, as, to prevent possible problems with the Antitrust Authority, it involves other companies. UnipolSai has already reached an agreement to take over the business branches of the insurance companies Banca Assurance Popolari, Lombardia Vita and Aviva Italia, owned by UBI. The Bolognese insurance group supported the share capital increase of 802.26 million euros of BPER Banca, the Emilian bank of which it is the first shareholder with 19.9%. In turn, BPER has already signed a contract with Intesa, which provided for the purchase of 532 UBI branches with approximately 1.2 million customers, of which approximately half in Lombardy. In July 2020, the antitrust authority ordered Intesa to sell as many of its own branches, in the event that the public subscription offer does not reach 67% of the shares. The transaction, which obtained the approval of the various Italian and European authorities, led to the delisting of UBI and provides for the merger between the two banks.

The sale is scheduled for the end of 2020, with the aim of closing the financial statements in April 2021, presenting a credit institution in seventh place in Europe in terms of size, with a value of assets under management of 1.1 trillion, loans for 460 billion and profits for five. The offer ends on 30 July 2020 with the achievement of 91.0149% of the capital of UBI. Therefore, having exceeded 90% of the share capital, the delisting procedures have begun which have led Intesa Sanpaolo to become the sole shareholder of UBI Banca. Intesa is required to complete the sale of 500 agencies within six months of the completion of the merger.

In October 2020, it was announced that Intesa Sanpaolo's private bank arm has reached an agreement to buy a 69% stake in Swiss-based bank REYL & Cie. On 30 January 2026, Intesa Sanpaolo bought the remaining 24% of REYL & Cie's capital that it did not own, thus gaining complete control over the Swiss bank and expanding its private banking business. In August 2022, ISP completed the 100 per cent acquisition of the Luxembourg private bank CBP Quilvest. The transaction is intended to create a second private banking hub to complement the Swiss one. In May 2024, Intesa Sanpaolo finalised the acquisition of Romanian lender First Bank, thus expanding its footprint in Romania. In November 2024, the bank also expressed interest to partner with BlackRock, world's biggest asset manager and an Intesa shareholder, with the aim to offer digital wealth management services to clients in Belgium and Luxembourg. On 1 November 2025, Intesa Sanpaolo merged First Bank into its Romanian branch (Intesa Sanpaolo Bank Romania).

== Divestment from Russia ==
Following the Russian invasion of Ukraine in 2022, ISP announced it would start working to divest its unit in Russia. In September 2023, Vladimir Putin approved a plan allowing for the sale of the banking group's Russian operations. As of January 2025, ISP has yet to finalise its exit.

== Snooping controversy ==
In August 2024, Intesa Sanpaolo fired one of its clerks, Vincenzo Coviello, after an internal investigation unearthed evidence of illicit activity. The public prosecutor's office of Bari accused Coviello of compromising national security by repeatedly gaining unauthorised access to the bank accounts of about 3,500 individuals, including the Italian prime minister Giorgia Meloni, Defence Minister Guido Crosetto, the prosecutor of the National Anti-Mafia and Anti-Terrorism Directorate, and several officers of the Carabinieri and Italy's financial police, Guardia di Finanza. Meloni suggested that Coviello's actions were part of a wider attempt by "pressure groups" to undermine Italian democracy.

== Major shareholders ==
As of July 2026, Intesa Sanpaolo's main shareholders were:

Shareholder	Stake (% of ordinary shares)
Fondazione Compagnia di San Paolo	6.526%
Fondazione Cariplo	5.437%
Market	88.037%

== Corporate governance ==
Intesa Sanpaolo has a single-tiered corporate governance system in which the Board of Directors alone are in charge of strategic supervision and control. The latter duty is carried out by the Management Control Committee instead of the Board of Directors itself. The bank adopted this single-tiered system in April 2016, replacing the former two-tiered structure. Previously, the supervisory board exercised control and strategic management functions, whereas the management board oversaw the management of the company's business. The supervisory board was appointed by shareholders in their annual meeting. It supervised the activities carried out by the management board and, in particular, approved the main strategic initiatives proposed by the management board. The management board appointed one of its members to be the CEO.

=== Board of directors ===
Members were appointed on 29 April 2022 for the following financial years: 2022, 2023 and 2024.

Position	Name
Chairman	Gian Maria Gros-Pietro
Deputy Chairperson	Paolo Andrea Colombo
Managing Director and CEO	Carlo Messina
Director	Franco Ceruti
Director	Paola Tagliavini
Director	Liana Logiurato
Director	Luciano Nebbia
Director	Bruno Picca
Director	Livia Pomodoro
Director	Maria Alessandra Stefanelli
Director	Bruno Maria Parigi
Director	Daniele Zamboni
Director	Maria Mazzarella
Director	Anna Gatti
Director	Fabrizio Mosca
Director	Milena Teresa Motta
Director	Maria Cristina Zoppo
Chairman of the Management Control Committee	Alberto Maria Pisani
Director	Roberto Franchini

== Financial information ==
Table with a comparison of Intesa Sanpaolo's financial performance over the last years.

Year	Net income (million €)	Total assets (million €)	Total equity (million €)
2025	9,321	959,887	
2024	8,666	933,285	
2023	7,724	963,570	
2022	4,354	975,683	61,655
2021	4,185	1,069,003	63,775
2020	3,277	1,002,614	65,871
2019	4,182	816,102	55,968
2018	4,050	787,721	54,024
2017	7,316 (with 3.500 billion one-off revenue from the Italian government)	796,861	56,205
2016	3,111	725,100	48,911
2015	2,739	676,496	47,776
2014	1,251	646,427	44,683
2013	-4,550	626,283	44,515
2012	1,605	673,472	49,613
2011	-8,190	639,221	47,040
2010	2,705	658,757	53,533
2009	2,805	624,844	52,681
2008	2,533	636,133	48,954

== Business units ==
The Group's activities are divided into six divisions:

- Banca dei Territori Division: caters to individuals, small and medium-sized enterprises and non-profit entities. It offers an array of services, including industrial credit, leasing, factoring, and even includes the digital bank Isybank and instant banking Mooney. The latter offers proximity banking services and is controlled through a partnership by Intesa Sanpaolo and Enel.
- IMI-Corporate and Investment Banking Division: present in 25 countries with a network of branches, representative offices, and subsidiaries carrying out corporate banking activities. The division has partnerships with several companies, financial institutions, and public administrations, all at both national and international levels.
- International Banks Division: present in 12 countries and carries out commercial banking activities in Central and Eastern Europe, the Middle East and North Africa.
- Private Banking Division: offers financial consulting to private individuals. Included in this is Fideuram - Intesa Sanpaolo Private Banking, which has 6,648 private bankers.
- Asset Management Division: develops asset management solutions for customers, external commercial networks and institutional clients. It notably includes Eurizon Capital, an asset management company with 413 billion euros in assets under management.
- Insurance Division: offers insurance and pension products as well as including Intesa Sanpaolo Vita- which controls Intesa Sanpaolo Assicura, Intesa Sanpaolo Life, Intesa Sanpaolo RBM Salute and Intesa Sanpaolo Insurance Agency - and Fideuram Vita.

== Subsidiaries ==
In addition to its strong presence in Italy, Intesa Sanpaolo has branches and representative offices around the world. The Group also directly controls many foreign banks, especially in Central and Eastern Europe, with more than 901 branches and about 7 million clients operating in retail and commercial banking.

Banca Intesa Beograd	Serbia
Bank Intesa	Russia
Alexbank	Egypt
CIB Bank	Hungary
Eximbank	Moldova
Intesa Sanpaolo Bank	Slovenia
Intesa Sanpaolo Banka	Bosnia and Herzegovina
Intesa Sanpaolo Bank Albania	Albania
Intesa Sanpaolo Bank	Romania
Pravex Bank	Ukraine
PBZ - Privredna Banka Zagreb	Croatia
VUB Banka	Slovakia and the Czech Republic

== Photo gallery ==
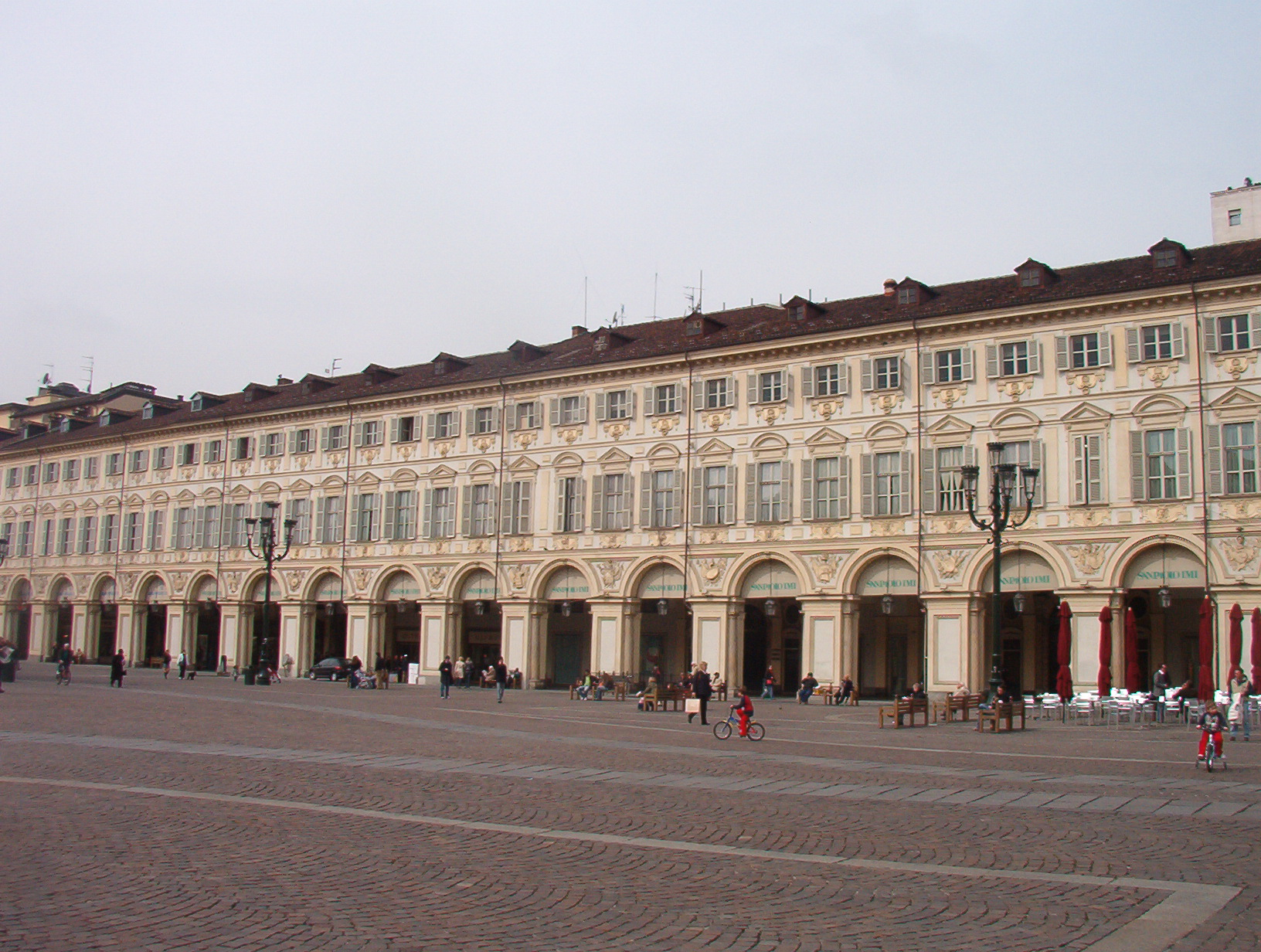
Intesa Sanpaolo former headquarters in piazza San Carlo, Turin

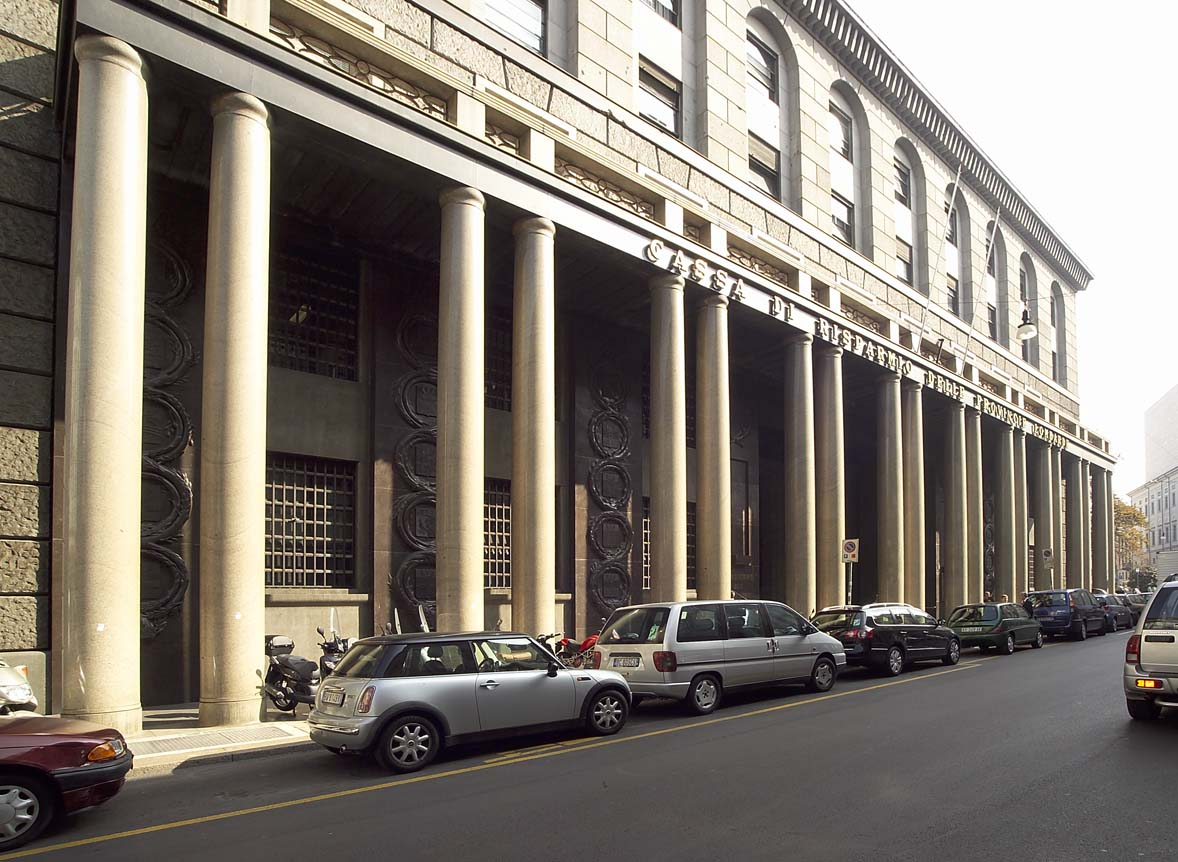
Intesa Sanpaolo building Palazzo delle Colonne, Milan

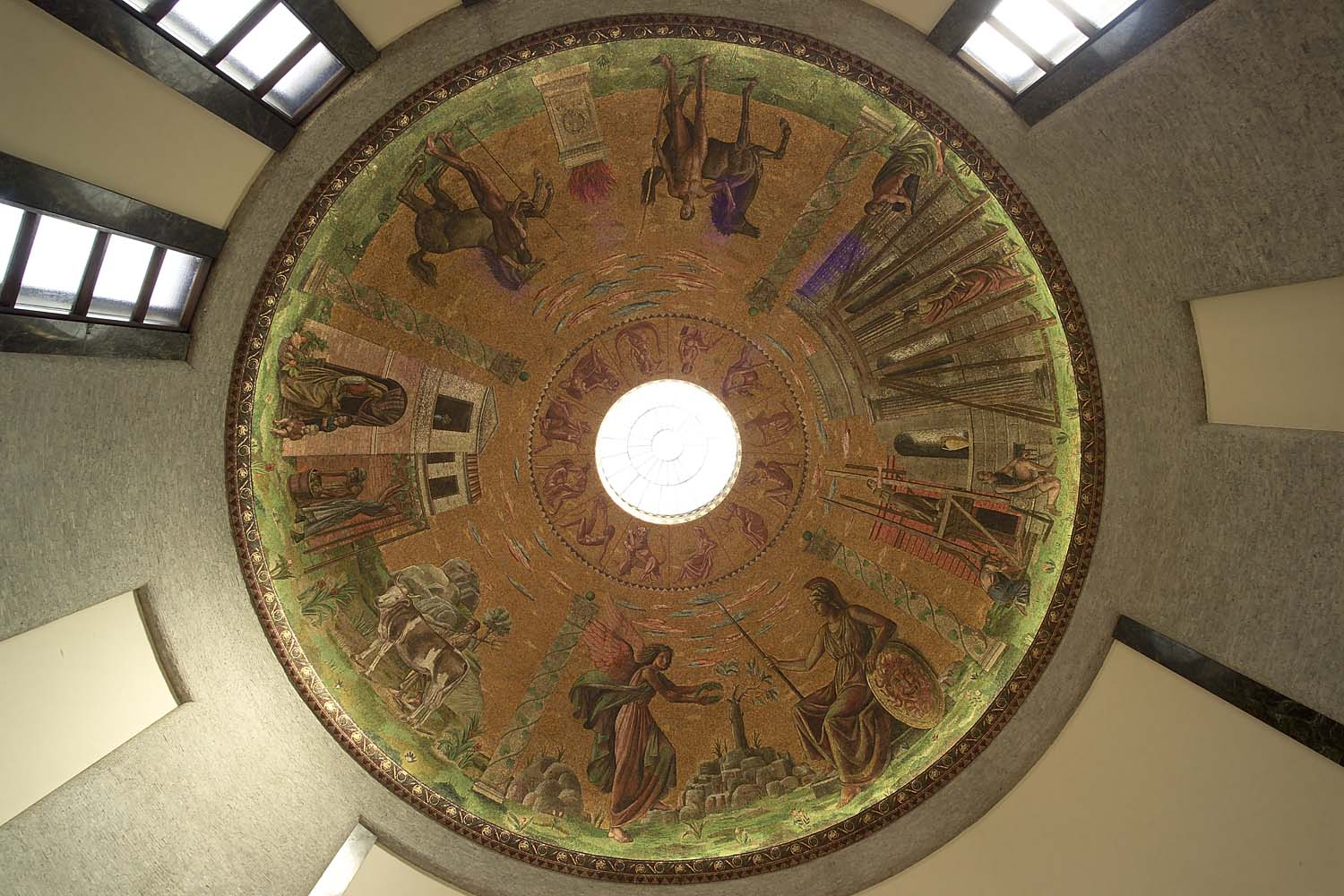

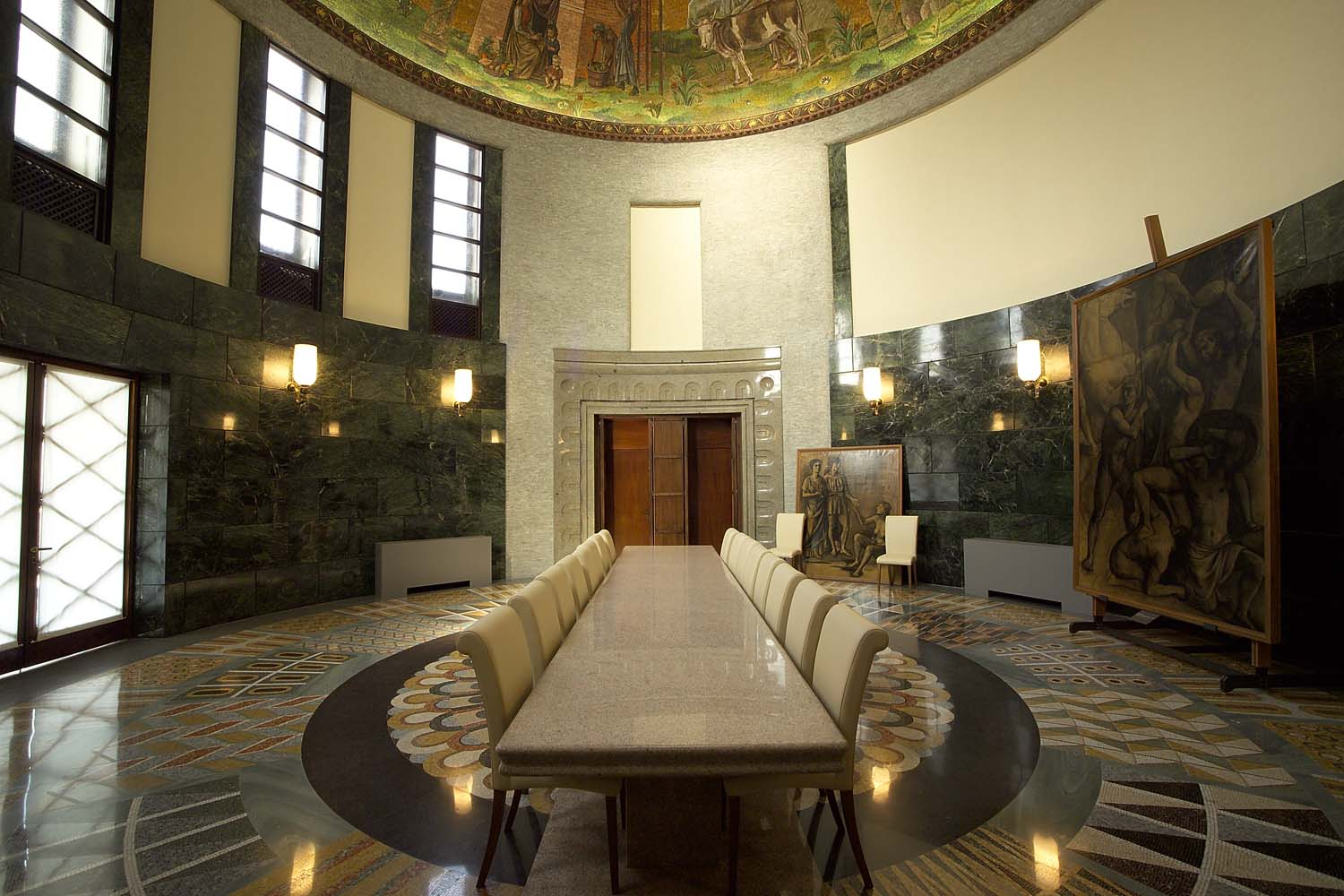

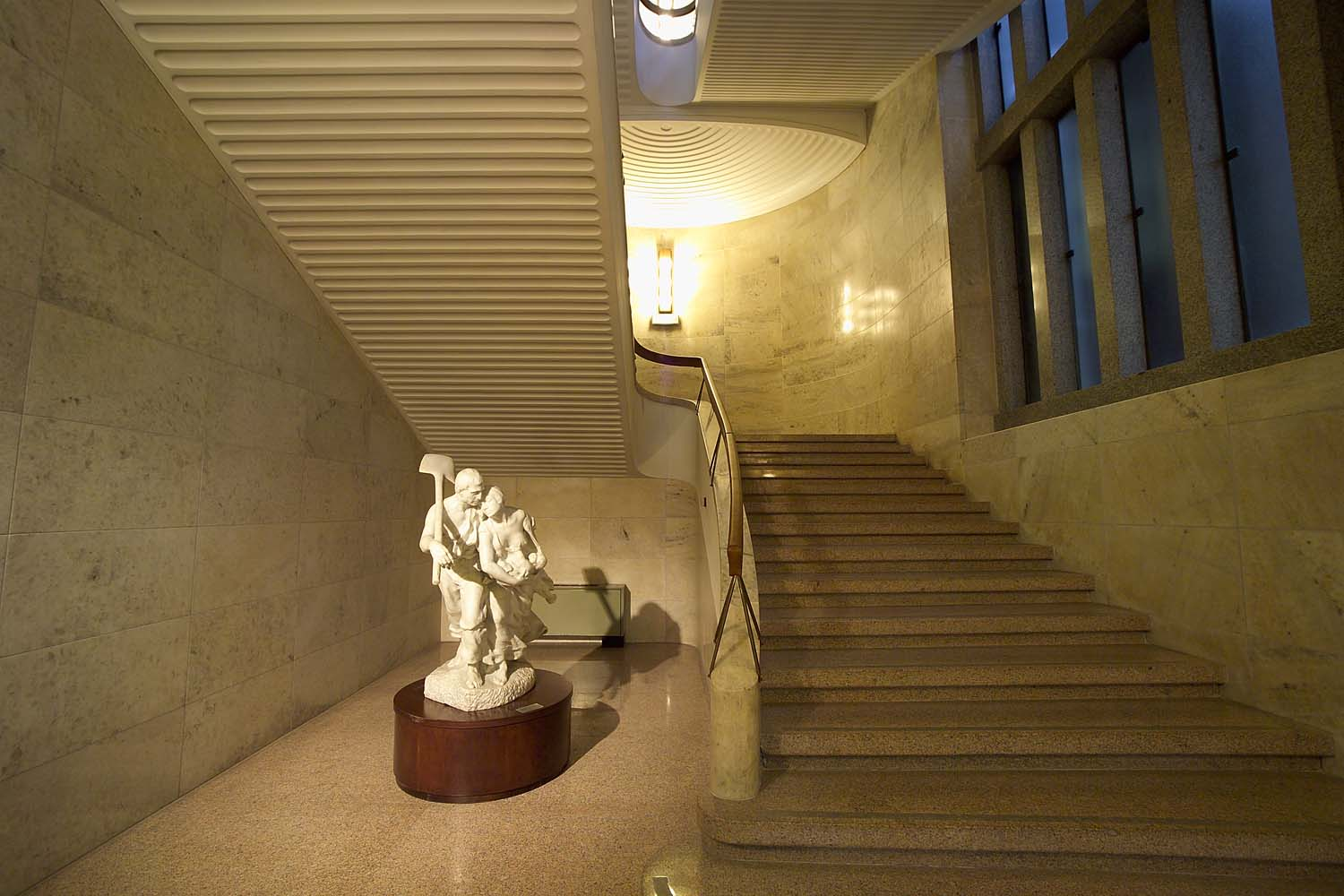

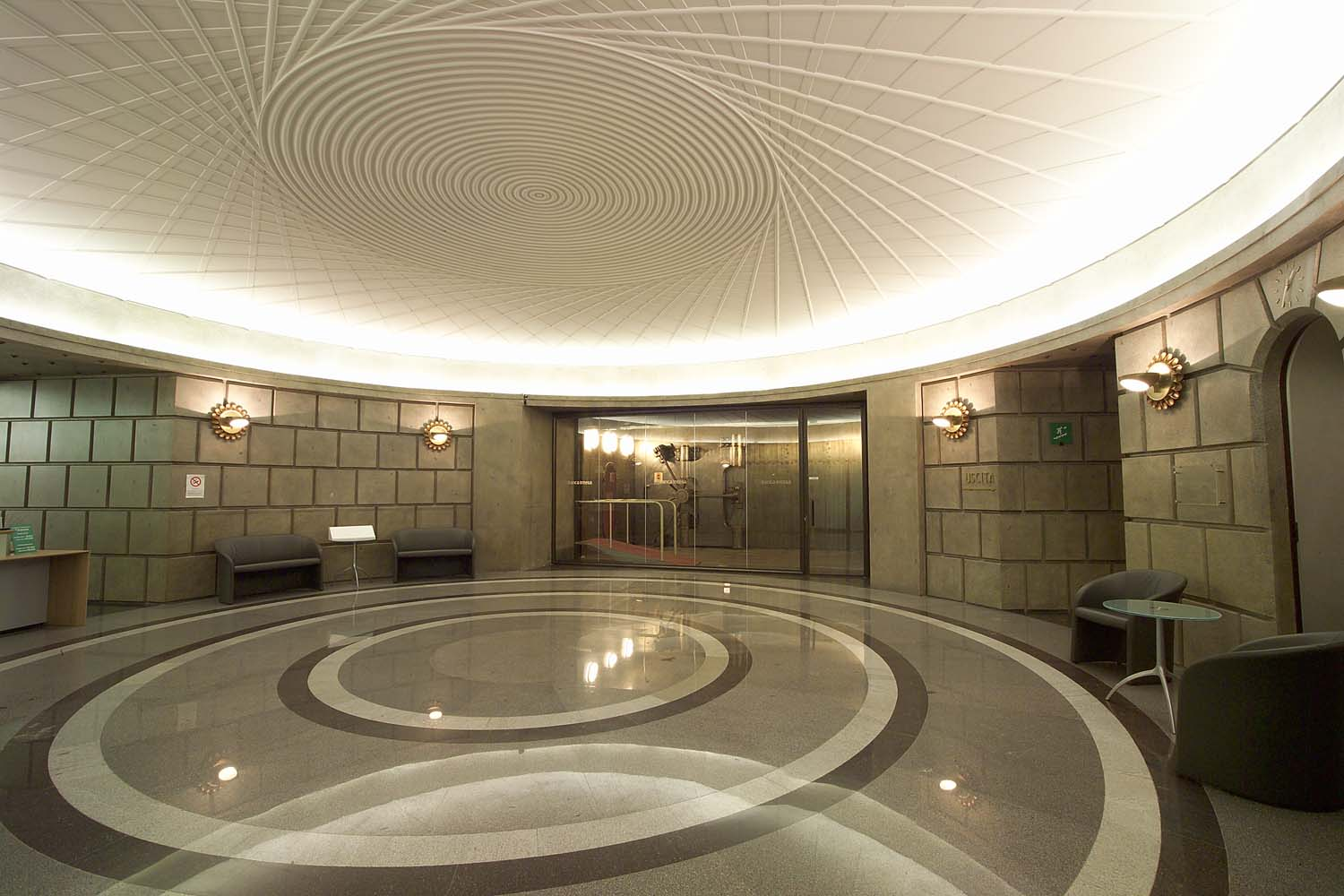

== See also ==
- Inter-Alpha Group of Banks
- List of banks in the euro area
- List of banks in Italy
