= Banca Cattolica di Trento =

Former bank in the Trentino region

The Banca Cattolica di Trento or Banca Cattolica Trentina was a cooperative bank founded in 1899 in Trento, County of Tyrol.

== Overview ==
The bank was established in 1899 with support from the Catholic Church, partly in response to the creation 13 years earlier of the Banca Cooperativa di Trento which emanated from the local liberal bourgeoisie. The new institution was intended as a central financial entity for the expanding network of local cooperative banks that was flourishing in the region in the wake of Pope Leo XIII's encyclical Rerum novarum of 1891.

In 1907, Banca Cattolica di Trento sponsored a majority-owned investment banking affiliate, the Banca Industriale di Trento, which started operations in January 1908. From 1908 to 1912, Alcide De Gasperi was vice-president and one of the three executive board members of the Banca Industriale.

In 1923, the bank inaugurated a new head office building in Trento, designed by architects Guido Ferrazza and Ottavio Cabiati.

In 1927, the Fascist regime, motivated to reduce the local influence of both the church and liberal networks, forced the merger of the Banca Cattolica, then chaired by senator Enrico Conci, with the Banca Cooperativa di Trento. The merged entity, named Banca del Trentino e dell'Alto Adige, soon experienced financial distress and closed on 14 June 1933. The Banca Industriale di Trento subsequently went into liquidation on 10 July 1933, a process that was completed in 1935. The bank's former operations were restructured in late 1934 to form the Banca di Trento.

== See also ==
- Banca Cattolica del Veneto
- Banca Cattolica di Molfetta
- List of banks in Italy
