= Cassa di Risparmio di Ascoli Piceno =

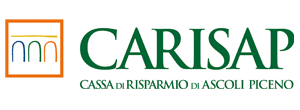
- Trade name: Carisap
- Type: subsidiary of a listed company
- Industry: Financial services
- Founded: 1842; 1991 (Società per azioni & Fondazione)
- Defunct: 2013 (S.p.A.)
- Headquarters: Ascoli Piceno, Marche, Italy
- Products: Retail banking
- Owner: Fondazione Carisap (1991–1998; majority); Banca Intesa (1998–2007); Intesa Sanpaolo (2007–2012)
- Parent: Intesa Sanpaolo

Cassa di Risparmio di Ascoli Piceno known as Carisap, is a former Italian regional bank based in Ascoli Piceno, Marche. A subsidiary of Intesa Sanpaolo, the bank merged with another subsidiary of the group, Banca dell'Adriatico in 2013.

The former owner of the bank, Fondazione Cassa di Risparmio di Ascoli Piceno (Fondazione Carisap), still operated as a charity organization. The foundation still held 0.3537% shares of Intesa Sanpaolo, as of 31 December 2013.

== History ==
Cassa di Risparmio di Ascoli Piceno was founded in Ascoli Piceno, Papal States in 1842, the bank became Società per azioni in 1992 due to Legge Amato. In the 1990s Cariplo acquired 25% shares of Carisap from Fondazione Carisap. Carisap followed the parent company Cariplo to merge with Banco Ambrosiano Veneto to form Banca Intesa on 1 January 1998, in July in of same year the group reached 66% ownership of the bank. In 2001, Ascoli became part of an intermediate holding company Holding IntesaBCI Centro, which already consists of 5 other saving banks (Italian: Cassa di Risparmio) who joined in 1999. In 2003, one more saving bank joined the mini-group. In 2007 Carisap followed the ultimate parent company Banca Intesa to become part of Intesa Sanpaolo Group.

In 2008, the 7 saving banks were transferred to Banca CR Firenze, a newly acquired subsidiary of Intesa Sanpaolo as the intermediate holding company. In 2012 Banca CR Firenze acquired the remaining 34% shares of Carisap S.p.A. from Fondazione Carisap for a price of €70 million, and then Banca CR Firenze sold Carisap to Intesa Sanpaolo for €205 million. Of the remaining 6 saving banks, 4 of them had also grouped as Casse di Risparmio dell'Umbria in the same year.

In 2013 Carisap was merged with Banca dell'Adriatico, another subsidiary of Interesa Sanpaolo which specialized in Marche, Abruzzo and Molise regions.

== Sponsorship ==
Carisap SpA was a shirt sponsor of Ascoli Calcio 1898. The bank also sponsored the annual San Benedetto Tennis Cup.

== Bank Foundation ==
The Fondazione Cassa di Risparmio di Ascoli Piceno (Fondazione Carisap) was established in 1992 as a private, independent, non-profit organisation dedicated to promoting social utility in the Ascoli Piceno area.

In its 2023–2025 strategic plan, it committed nearly €12 million to cultural heritage, social services, education, health and sustainable development projects.

Recent initiatives include the AvverAbile employment programme for people with disabilities (supported with €200,000 in funding) and a €340,000 grant for palliative home care services in collaboration with multiple Third-sector entities.

The foundation also owns and supports the Circolo Sportivo Fondazione Carisap, a community sports and social centre focusing on inclusion and cohesion, and is affiliated with Ariadne, a major European philanthropic network for social change.

According to its 2024 financial report, the foundation posted a surplus of €13.5 million, managed an endowment worth €284.6 million, and approved €5.4 million in grants across 217 initiatives benefiting tens of thousands in the community.

== See also ==
- List of banks in Italy
