= Banca di Legnano =

- Native name: Banca di Legnano
- Founded: 1887
- Defunct: 2013
- Headquarters: Legnano, Italy
- Owner: Banca Popolare di Milano (100%)
- Parent: Banca Popolare di Milano

Banca di Legnano was an Italian bank based in Legnano, Lombardy. The bank was absorbed into the parent company Banca Popolare di Milano in 2013.

== History ==
Banca di Legnano was a subsidiary of Banca Commerciale Italiana (BCI) for 55% shares. In 1999, BCI merged with Banca Intesa to form the Intesa–BCI group. On 1 January 2001 Banca Popolare di Milano (BPM) acquired all 55% shares from Intesa, for 1,300 billion lire. It also triggered a public offer to buy the remain shares. In 2002 BPM owned 100% shares of Banca di Legnano. In 2007, BPM was the owner of the bank for 93.51% shares, with the rest owned by Crédit Industriel et Commercial (CIC) for 6.49%, which was acquired in 2004. In 2011 BPM acquired the remaining 6.49% shares for €100 million.

In 2012 Cassa di Risparmio di Alessandria was absorbed into Banca di Legnano. In the next year Banca di Legnano was absorbed into BPM on 14 September. On 31 December 2012 the bank had a shareholders equity of €960 million.

== Sponsorship ==
The bank was a sponsor of Coppa Bernocchi.

== See also ==
- List of banks in Italy
