= Nuovo Banco Ambrosiano =

The Nuovo Banco Ambrosiano was the bank replacing the Banco Ambrosiano after its collapse. In 1989 the bank merged with the Banca Cattolica del Veneto (Catholic Bank of Veneto) to form the Banco Ambrosiano Veneto. In 1998 the latter bank formed the Banca Intesa together with the Cassa di Risparmio delle Provincie Lombarde (Cariplo).

== See also ==
- List of banks in Italy
