= Banca di Trento e Bolzano =

Former Italian bank

The Banca di Trento e Bolzano, known from 1934 to 1947 as Banca di Trento, was a commercial bank based in Trento, Italy.

== Overview ==
The Banca di Trento was formed in late 1934 by reorganization of the former Banca del Trentino e dell'Alto Adige, itself formed in 1927 by merger of two local cooperative banks established in the late 19th century. Unlike these predecessors, the new institution was formed as a joint-stock company, in which four public banks (Banco di Sicilia, Banca Monte dei Paschi di Siena, Istituto Bancario San Paolo di Torino, and Banco di Napoli) together owned 90 percent of equity capital. In 1936, the local investment entity Società Anonima Finanziaria Immobiliare Trentina (SAFIT, known as Istituto Immobiliare Trentino from 1929 to 1935 and as Istituto Atesino di Sviluppo after 1978) acquired majority ownership. The bank subsequently opened branches in Rovereto, Riva del Garda, Borgo Valsugana, Cavalese, Cles, Egna, Pergine Valsugana, and Tione di Trento, all (except Egna) localities of the Trentino region.

In 1946–1947, in the changed circumstances of postwar northeastern Italy, the bank expanded into South Tyrol by opening branches in Bolzano/Bozen, Bressanone/Brixen, Termeno/Tramin and Ortisei/Urtijëi, as well as Mezzolombardo, Vigo di Fassa and Levico Terme in Trentino. In 1947 it correspondingly renamed itself to Banca di Trento e Bolzano, reflecting the expanded regional footprint. From 1946 to 1962, the bank was led by Beniamino Andreatta who later went on to a national political career.

In 1981, the bank opened a representative office in Rome, and in 1984 another one in Munich.

In 1995, as the Banca di Trento e Bolzano was experiencing financial distress, the Istituto Atesino di Sviluppo (ISA) sold a majority stake to Banco Ambrosiano Veneto (BAV). BAV in turn merged in 1998 into the newly formed Banca Intesa, itself merged in 2007 into Intesa Sanpaolo. In 2012, the ISA sold its residual stake to Intesa Sanpaolo. In 2015, Intesa Sanpaolo fully absorbed Banca di Trento e Bolzano and phased out its brand.

== See also ==
- Banking in Italy
- List of banks in Italy
