= Paolo Andrea Colombo =

Italian business executive

Paolo A. Colombo
- Born: 12 April 1960 (age 65); Milan, Italy
- Occupation: Businessperson

Paolo Andrea Colombo (born 12 April 1960, in Milan) is an Italian business executive. In May 2011, he was appointed president of Enel alongside CEO Fulvio Conti. He is deputy chairman of Intesa Sanpaolo.

== Biography ==
Since 1989, Colombo has been a professor of Accounting and Budget at Bocconi University in Milan, the same institute that awarded him his degree with honours in Business Administration in 1984.

As an accountant and auditor, throughout his career, Paolo Andrea Colombo has held roles as the Director of operating companies in different areas of the market including Saipem, Pirelli Pneumatici, Publitalia 80, RCS Mediagroup, Telecom Italia Mobile, Eni, and Sias.

He is a founding member of Borghesi Colombo & Associati, a financial management consultancy firm with clients in Italy and abroad, active since 2006. He is also currently president of the GE Capital Interbanca supervisory board, of Aviva Vita and a member of the board of directors for Mediaset and Versace.
