= Gian Maria Gros-Pietro =

Italian businessman (born 1942)

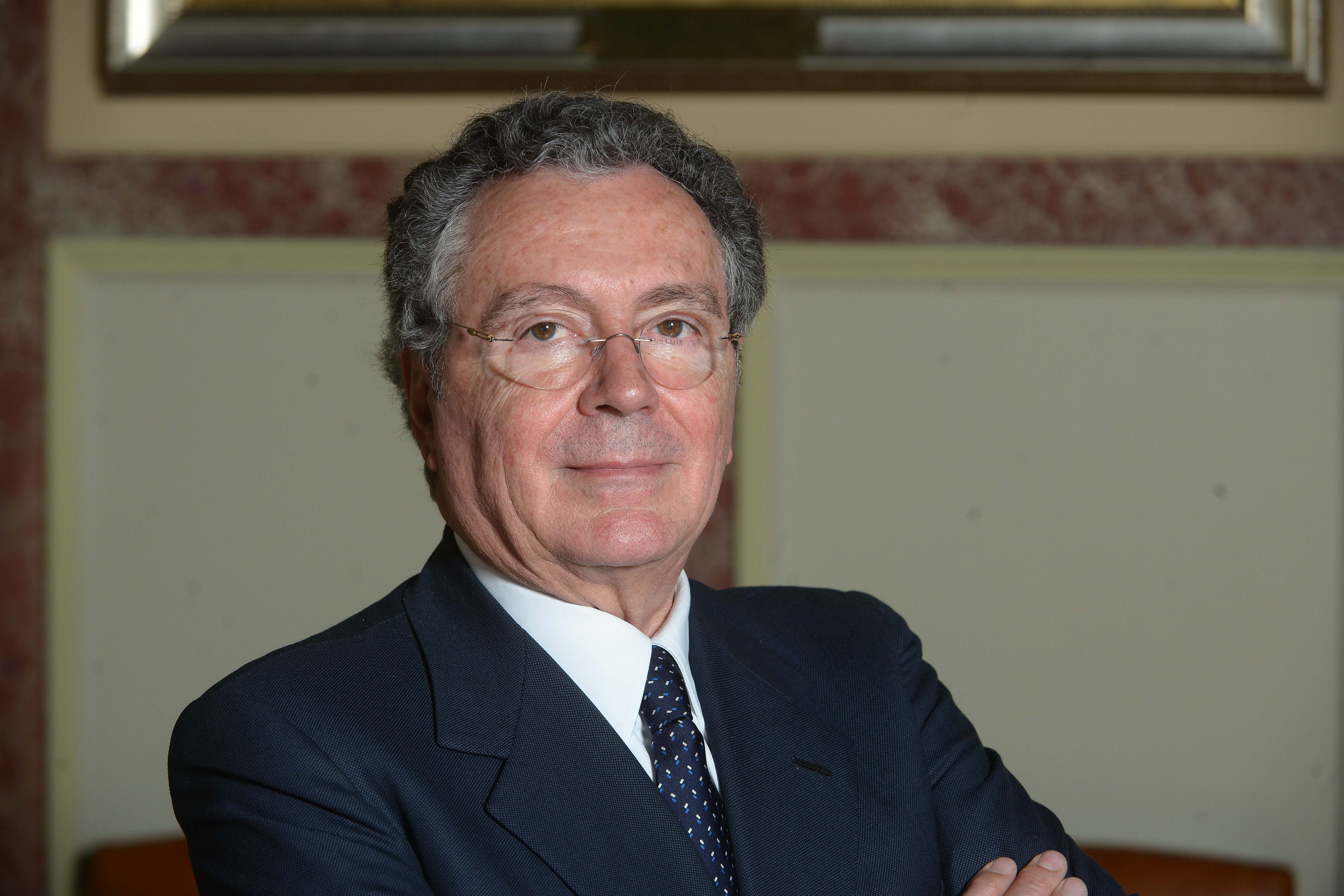
- Gros-Pietro in 2013
- Born: 4 February 1942 (age 84)
- Education: University of Turin
- Occupation: Businessman

Gian Maria Gros-Pietro (born 4 February 1942) is an Italian businessman. He has been chair of the board of directors of Intesa Sanpaolo since 27 April 2016, and member of the board of directors at Luiss Guido Carli University of Rome.

== Early life ==
Gros-Pietro was born in Turin. He graduated in economics and business at the University of Turin in 1964. He taught business economics and industrial economics and politics until 2004.

== Business career ==
Between 1974 and 1995, he directed Ceris (Institute for Economics Research on Firms and Growth, the main economic body of the National Research Council – CNR), while in 2004 he was appointed chairman of the Economic and Business department at LUISS University in Rome and held that appointment for seven years.

From 1997 to 1999 he was chairman of the Institute for Industrial Reconstruction (IRI), leading the privatization of its subsidiaries. He was in charge of similar responsibilities both at Eni from 1999 to 2002, supervising the liberalization of the Italian gas market as well as the group's expansion, and at Atlantia S.p.A. (formerly Austostrade S.p.A.) from 2002 to 2010.

Gros-Pietro was a member of CNEL (National Council for Economy and Labour) from 1996 to 2002. Since then, he presides over the Scientific Committee of Nomisma, a company focused on economic studies, and he is part of the Executive Committee of ISPI (Institute for International Political Studies), of ABI's Executive Committee, of FeBAF's Executive Board (Italian Banking, Insurance and Finance Federation) and of the Employers' Association of Turin.

He is part of the board of directors of ASTM (acting as chairman) and Edison. He is member of the Italy-USA Foundation.
