= Cassa di Risparmio di Biella =

Caribiella
- Native name: Cassa di Risparmio di Biella
- Founded: 1856; 1992 (S.p.A. and Fondazione)
- Defunct: 1994 (S.p.A. only)
- Fate: merger (S.p.A. only)
- Successor: Biverbanca
- Headquarters: Biella, Italy

Cassa di Risparmio di Biella (Caribiella) was an Italian regional bank and charity organization, based in Biella, Piedmont. The bank section was merged with Cassa di Risparmio di Vercelli in 1994, while the charity organization, Fondazione Cassa di Risparmio di Biella, still contributes the revenue to Biella and surrounding areas.

== Bank ==
- 1856 Cassa di Risparmio di Biella e Circondario was formed by Giovanni Pietro Losana
- 1970s issues Miniassegno
- 1992 Due to Legge Amato, Cassa di Risparmio di Biella S.p.A. and Fondazione Cassa di Risparmio di Biella was formed to separate the function of bank and non-profit organization
- 1994 Cassa di Risparmio di Biella merged with Cassa di Risparmio di Vercelli to form Cassa di Risparmio di Biella e Vercelli

== Bank Foundation ==
The foundation sponsored the local literature award Premio Biella Letteratura e Industria. It owned a minority ownership in Cassa Depositi e Prestiti (0.10%), as well as Biella-Cerrione Airport (Società Aeroporto Cerrione, 27.75%). As of 31 December 2014, the foundation had a shareholders equity of €221,611,969.

== See also ==
- Cassa di Risparmio di Asti
- Cassa di Risparmio di Alessandria, now part of Banca Popolare di Milano
- Cassa di Risparmio di Cuneo, now part of UBI Banca
- Cassa di Risparmio di Torino, now part of UniCredit
- List of banks in Italy
