= Banca Intesa =

Italian banking group

Banca Intesa S.p.A.

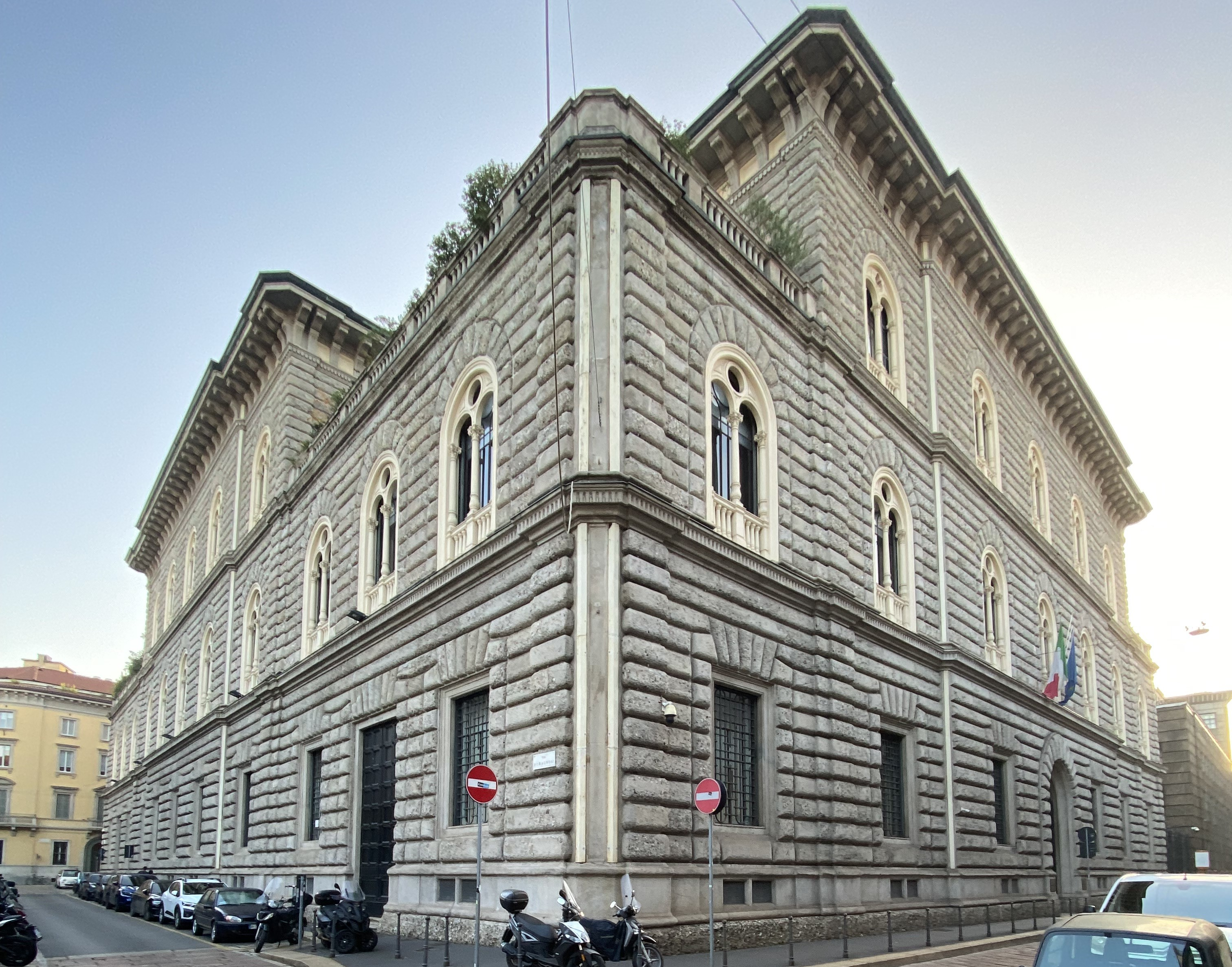
- The Ca' de Sass in Milan, head office of Banca Intesa
- Company type: Public
- Industry: Financial services
- Predecessor: Cariplo; Banco Ambrosiano Veneto; Banca Commerciale Italiana
- Founded: 2 January 1998
- Defunct: 31 December 2006
- Fate: merged with Sanpaolo IMI
- Successor: Intesa Sanpaolo
- Headquarters: Milan, Italy
Key people
Giovanni Bazoli	(Chairman)
Corrado Passera	(CEO)
- Services: Commercial banking; Investment banking; Private banking; Asset management
- Net income: ▼€2.559 billion (2006)
- Total assets: ▲€291.781 billion (2006)
- Total equity: ▲€18.166 billion (2006)
- Number of employees: ▼56,553 (2006 average)
- Subsidiaries: Banca Caboto; Intesa Private Banking; Intesa Mediocredito; Banca CIS; Biverbanca; Banca di Trento e Bolzano; Cariparma; Casse del Centro; FriulAdria
- Capital ratio: ▼5.51% (Core Tier 1 ratio, Basel II, Dec.2006)
- Website: www.bancaintesa.it
- Footnotes / references data from annual report's consolidated financial statement

Banca Intesa S.p.A. was an Italian banking group, formed in 1998 by merger of Cassa di Risparmio delle Provincie Lombarde (Cariplo) and Banco Ambrosiano Veneto. The next year, the banking group merged with Banca Commerciale Italiana to become IntesaBCi, but the name of the group was reverted to Banca Intesa in 2003.

In 2007, Banca Intesa merged with another banking group Sanpaolo IMI to become Intesa Sanpaolo. (Note: or known as other systemically important institutions (O-SIIs))

== History ==
Banca Intesa was formed in 1998 from the merger of Cassa di Risparmio delle Provincie Lombarde (Cariplo) and Banco Ambrosiano Veneto (former Nuovo Banco Ambrosiano and its predecessor Banco Ambrosiano, as well as Banca Cattolica del Veneto).

In 1999, Banca Commerciale Italiana entered the group, which pursuant to the merger in 2001, changed its name in IntesaBCi; on 1 January 2003, the group's name changed to Banca Intesa. The group also acquired many regional banks, including Cariparma, FriulAdria (both sold to Crédit Agricole after 2007 merger), Carisap, Carifol.

However, Intesa also sold some of them, for example Carispezia (to Banca CR Firenze in 2004), Cassa di Risparmio di Alessandria, Banca di Legnano (to Banca Popolare di Milano), Cassa di Risparmio di Carrara (to Banca Carige) and Banca Carime (to Banca Popolare Commercio e Industria in 2001). 20 branches was also sold to Banca Nuova, with additional 26 branches was sold to Banca Nuova's parent company Banca Popolare di Vicenza on 1 January 2001, for 250 billion lire, as well as 51 branches to Unipol Banca for 400 billion lire, as part of the response to the Italian Competition Authority investigation, on the monopoly of the bank after the merger with Banca Commerciale Italiana.

Crédit Agricole was the major shareholder of the group for 25.51% shortly before the merger of Intesa with BCI.

Banca Intesa and Sanpaolo IMI announced, in August 2006, that they were to merge to found Italy's biggest and Europe's third-largest banking group in terms of total assets. The effective merger date was 1 January 2007 and adopted the name "Intesa Sanpaolo SpA". The registered office of the new bank was Turin and Milan remained as the secondary registered office.

On 1 January 2007, Sanpaolo IMI merged into Banca Intesa and its name changed to Intesa Sanpaolo SpA.

In 2008, Sergey Yastrzhembsky worked to establish a Russian-Italian investment bank which would be supported by both the Intesa banking group and VEB.

== Divisions ==
Banca Intesa SpA focuses in four main business areas.

- The Retail Division serves individuals, small businesses, small and medium enterprises and non-profit organizations; its main activities include retail banking, wealth management, private banking and industrial credit.
- The Corporate Division serves mid and large corporates, financial institutions and public administrations; its main activities include mergers and acquisitions, structured financial services, merchant banking, capital market, global custody, and the specialized international network.
- The Italian Subsidiary Banks Division includes banking subsidiaries rooted in regional markets.
- The International Subsidiary Banks Division involves subsidiaries abroad, providing retail and commercial banking services mainly in central Eastern Europe. Banca Intesa has branches and representative offices in Europe, Asia, Latin and North America, and Africa.

== Ownership ==
Prior the merger effective on 1 January 2007, the ownership ratio was:

1. Crédit Agricole 17.84%
2. Fondazione Cariplo 9.22%
3. Generali group (Assicurazioni Generali, Alleanza Assicurazioni and other subsidiaries) 7.54%
4. Lombardo voting syndicate (Banca Lombarda e Piemontese, Carlo Tassara, Mittel, some shares are excluded from the voting syndicate) 4.88%
5. Fondazione Cariparma 4.33%
6. Other shareholders 56.19%

== See also ==
- List of banks in Italy
