= Casse di Risparmio dell'Umbria =

Italian retail bank

Casse dell'Umbria
- Native name: Casse di Risparmio dell'Umbria S.p.A.
- Type: Subsidiary of a listed company
- Industry: Financial services
- Predecessor: Cassa di Risparmio di Città di Castello; Cassa di Risparmio di Foligno; Cassa di Risparmio di Spoleto; Cassa di Risparmio di Terni e Narni
- Founded: 1836 in Spoleto (Spoleto); 1992 in Spoleto (S.p.A.); 2012 in Terni (Casse dell'Umbria)
- Founder: Count Luigi Pianciani (Spoleto); Intesa Sanpaolo (Casse dell'Umbria)
- Headquarters: 49/A Corso Tacito, Terni, Italy
- Number of locations: 106 branches (2014)
- Area served: Umbria region
- Key people: Alberto Cianetti (chairman); Pietro Buzzi (general manager)
- Services: Retail, commercial and private banking
- Net income: ▼ (€6,217,131) (2015)
- Total assets: ▲€3,221,966,313 (2015)
- Total equity: ▼€383,877,143 (2015)
- Owner: Intesa Sanpaolo; others (1.30%)
- Parent: Intesa Sanpaolo
- Capital ratio: 22.34% (CET1)
- Website: Official website (in Italian)

Casse di Risparmio dell'Umbria S.p.A., known as Casse dell'Umbria, is an Italian retail bank based in Terni, Umbria. The bank is a subsidiary of Intesa Sanpaolo (via Banca CR Firenze).

The headquarter of the bank was next to Fondazione Cassa di Risparmio di Terni e Narni (Fondazione Carit) on Corso Tacito, Terni (49 and 49/A respectively).

== History ==
=== Cassa di Risparmio di Spoleto ===
Cassa di Risparmio di Spoleto (Carispo) was found in December 1836 in Spoleto, in the Papal States. In the same year Cassa di Risparmio di Roma also found. Since CR Roma was merged into Banca di Roma in 1992, CR Spoleto was the oldest surviving Cassa di Risparmio of the area of former Papal States, until the merger in 2012. After the merger Cassa di Risparmio in Bologna became the oldest surviving saving bank of former Papal States instead.

The first chairman of the bank was Luigi Pianciani (1836–1847). He was elected as the gonfaloniere of Spoleto in 1847. He served as the mayor of Rome from 1873 to 1875.

In 1992 CR Spoleto also spin off its bank activities to form Cassa di Risparmio di Spoleto S.p.A., with the original entity was renamed to Fondazione Cassa di Risparmio di Spoleto. The banking foundation sold 30% stake to Cassa di Risparmio delle Provincie Lombarde (Cariplo) in mid 1990s.

==== Casse del Centro ====
In July 1999 Banca Intesa (ex-Cariplo) owned a majority interests (59.44%) of the bank, as well as forming a sub-holding company: Holding Intesa Centro (Casse del Centro), for a potential integration of the saving banks in central Italy. During the peak of Casse del Centro, the holding had 4 separate banks from Umbria (which were merged in 2012), as well as Cassa di Risparmio di Fano (sold to Credito Valtellinese in 2008), Cassa di Risparmio di Ascoli Piceno (absorbed by Banca dell'Adriatico in 2013), Cassa di Risparmio della Provincia di Viterbo and Cassa di Risparmio di Rieti (absorbed into Intesa Sanpaolo in 2015). The shares of Casse del Centro was transferred to Banca CR Firenze in 2008 from the parent company Intesa Sanpaolo, which the Florence bank became the sub-holding company for the bank group instead, as Casse del Centro was liquidated soon after.

==== Merger ====
According to the last annual report of the bank before the merger, CR Spoleto had 34 retail branches, 3 business centre and 1 private banking centre in 2011. The company had a total assets of €993,905,094, shareholders equity of €87,937,513 and a Tier 1 capital ratio (Basel II basis) of 19.59%. It was owned by Banca CR Firenze (60.13%), the foundation (27.47%) and other investors (12.40%).

After the merger the foundation purchased 8–10, via Felice Cavallotti, Spoleto from Casse di Risparmio dell'Umbria. The bank and foundation previously occupied 6, 8, 10 via Felice Cavallotti as headquarter.

=== Casse di Risparmio dell'Umbria ===
The bank was a product of the merger of the saving banks of Città di Castello, Foligno, Spoleto and Terni–Narni. More specially the three banks were absorbed by Spoleto. However, the headquarter of the bank was relocated to Terni, in the former headquarter of Terni–Narni Saving Bank. (from Spoleto in the Province of Perugia to Terni in the Province of Terni)

In November 2015 Intesa Sanpaolo became direct parent company of the bank, eliminating Banca CR Firenze as the intermediate.

On 17 June 2016 Intesa Sanpaolo announced the plan to absorb the subsidiary. 1 ordinary share of Casse di Risparmio dell'Umbria was exchanged with 0.9623 shares of Intesa Sanpaolo, as well as 1 preferred share to 1.0842 Intesa Sanpaolo shares. 210,803 ordinary new shares of Intesa Sanpaolo were issued.

== See also ==
- Banca dell'Umbria, a defunct subsidiary of UniCredit
- Banca Popolare di Spoleto, an Italian bank based in Spoleto, Umbria
