= Cassa di Risparmio di Civitavecchia =

Cariciv
- Native name: Cassa di Risparmio di Civitavecchia
- Type: subsidiary of a listed company
- Industry: Financial services
- Founded: 1847; 1992 (S.p.A. and foundation)
- Defunct: 2015
- Fate: absorbed into parent company
- Successor: Cassa di Risparmio di Civitavecchia Foundation; Intesa Sanpaolo branches
- Headquarters: Civitavecchia, Italy
- Services: Retail banking
- Total equity: €76,183,889 (2014)
- Owner: Banca CR Firenze (51%); C.R. Civitavecchia Foundation (49%)
- Parent: Intesa Sanpaolo
- Footnotes; 2014 data

Cassa di Risparmio di Civitavecchia (Cariciv) was an Italian retail bank based in Civitavecchia, in the Metropolitan City of Rome Capital. In 2015, along with two other Lazio-based subsidiaries: Rieti and Viterbo, were absorbed by parent company Intesa Sanpaolo. Fondazione Cassa di Risparmio di Civitavecchia found in 1992 by separating the charity function from the bank, was still operates as in 2016.

== History ==
The history of banking activities in Civitavecchia, could be traced back to the local mount of piety. In 1847 the saving bank (Italian: Cassa di Risparmio) was found by the instruction of Pope Pius IX, the head of states of the Papal States which Civitavecchia belongs at that time. Father Felice Guglielmi was the first president of the bank, with local chamber of commerce and commune government were the main funders.

In 1992, due to Legge Amato, the organization was split into Cassa di Risparmio di Civitavecchia S.p.A. (limited company) and Ente Cassa di Risparmio di Civitavecchia (later renamed from ente to foundation, Italian: fondazione).

Banca di Roma also purchased 28.57% shares of the bank at that time. The bank was later acquired by Banca CR Firenze (Florence Saving Bank). In 2000 Florence Saving Bank purchased an additional 11% shares (increased from 40%) for 30.7 billion lire (about €16 million). The foundation retained 49% shares until 2014. The bank followed Florence Saving Bank to become part of Intesa Sanpaolo in 2008. In December 2014 Intesa Sanpaolo purchased the remain 49% shares for €52 million, as the first step of simplify group structure. In the other hand, the Ministry of Economy and Finance had also introduced reform to banking foundations, forcing them to diversify investments (no single investment (in fair value) accounted for 33% of the total assets). The stake in the bank accounted for 46.66% of the total assets of the foundation, as at 31 December 2013, based on the historical price Banca CR Firenze paid on 15 June 2000.

In 2015, Cariciv, Rieti and Viterbo, were absorbed by parent company Intesa Sanpaolo.

In the last annual report of the bank, Cariciv had a shareholders equity of €76,183,889 as on 31 December 2014.

== See also ==
- List of banks in Italy
