= Banca Cattolica del Veneto =

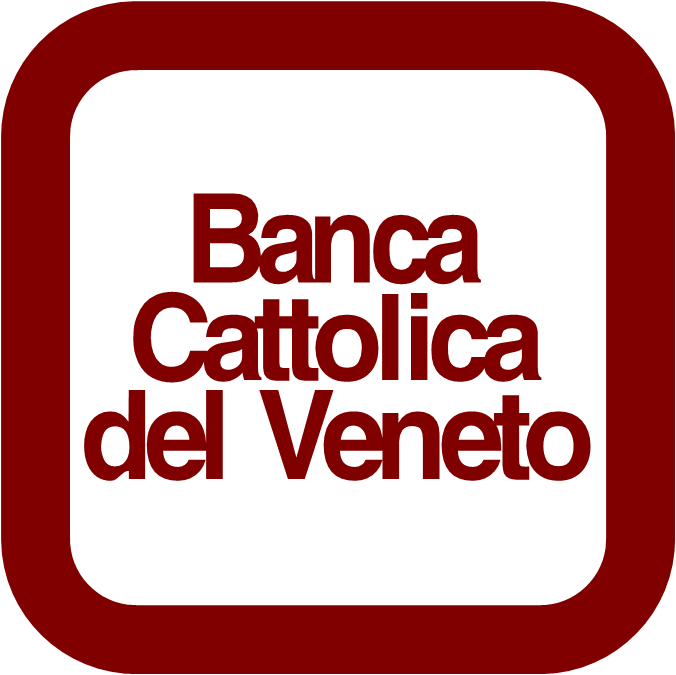
Logo

Banca Cattolica del Veneto was an Italian bank based in Vicenza, Veneto. In 1989 it was merged with Nuovo Banco Ambrosiano to form Banco Ambrosiano Veneto.

== History ==
Founded in 1892, as Banca Cattolica Vicentina by the Catholic Church, in 1930 the bank was renamed to Banca Cattolica del Veneto, as well as absorbing Banca Cadorina, Banca Cattolica Atestina and Banca Cattolica di Udine in 1930, Banca Feltrina, Banca Provinciale di Belluno and Banca Cattolica San Liberale in 1931, Banca Depositi e Prestiti di Feltre in 1936, Banca Depositi e Prestiti G. Fabris, F. Favero and Banca Bassanese A. Girardello in 1938.

In 1946 the bank acquired Banca Agricola Distrettuale; Banca Veneziana di Crediti e Conti Correnti in 1948, Banca Mandamentale di Maniago e Sacile in 1950, Banca San Daniele in 1951 and Banca Triestina in 1969.

== See also ==
- List of banks in Italy
