= Banca Commerciale Italiana =

Former Italian bank

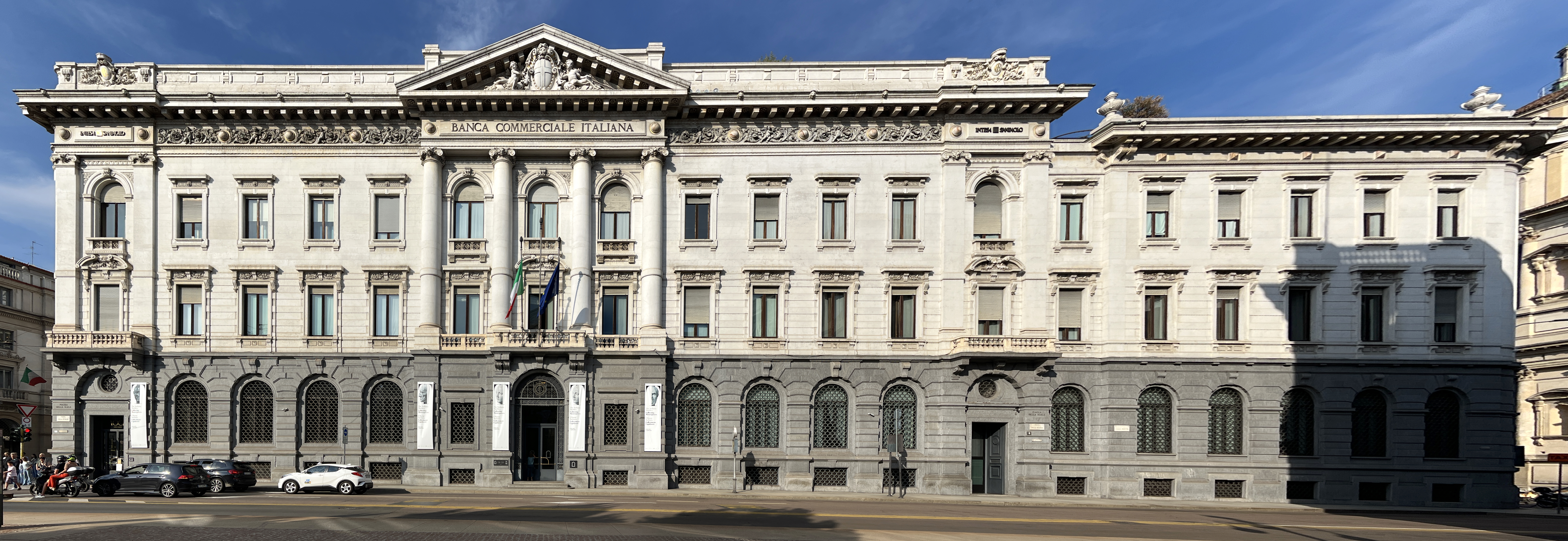
- Headquarters building in Milan
- Industry: Banking
- Predecessor: Credito Mobiliare
- Founded: October 10, 1894; 131 years ago
- Defunct: January 1, 2003
- Fate: Merged
- Successor: Banca Intesa, then Intesa Sanpaolo
- Headquarters: Milan, Italy

Banca Commerciale Italiana (BCI, colloquially known as Comit), founded in 1894, was a major Italian bank based in Milan. In 1999, it merged with the group recently formed by the combination of Cassa di Risparmio delle Provincie Lombarde and Banco Ambroveneto to form IntesaBCI, in which BCI temporarily became a sub-holding company. On 1 January 2003, the group's name changed to Banca Intesa, later Intesa Sanpaolo.

== History ==
BCI's predecessor was the Credito Mobiliare, founded in 1862. On 10 October 1894, BCI was re-established as a private joint-stock bank with capital contributed by banks from Germany (78 percent), Austria (13 percent), and Switzerland (9 percent). These included Creditanstalt, Deutsche Bank, Darmstädter Bank, Berliner Handels-Gesellschaft, Disconto-Gesellschaft, and S. Bleichröder, with stakes from 10 to 13 percent each, whereas the other participating German and Swiss banks had individual stakes in the low single digits. The Germanic dominance didn’t last long, however, as the Banque de Paris et des Pays-Bas also became a significant shareholder in 1898. BCI was originally modelled along the lines of German banks, making both short- and long-term loans. The young BCI continued to specialize in loans to industry, especially to companies in shipping, textiles, and electricity. Giuseppe Toeplitz was the managing director of Banca Commerciale Italiana. His Villa Toeplitz is still located in Varese

In the mid of the 20th century, the bank was nationalized by Istituto per la Ricostruzione Industriale. In 1936, along with Banco di Roma and Credito Italiano, they were classified as "a bank of national interest" under the Banking Law of 1936.

In 1999 70% shares of BCI were acquired by Banca Intesa.

On 1 January 2001 BCI sold Banca di Legnano to Banca Popolare di Milano. In the same year, the company was absorbed into the parent company.

=== International expansion through World War II ===
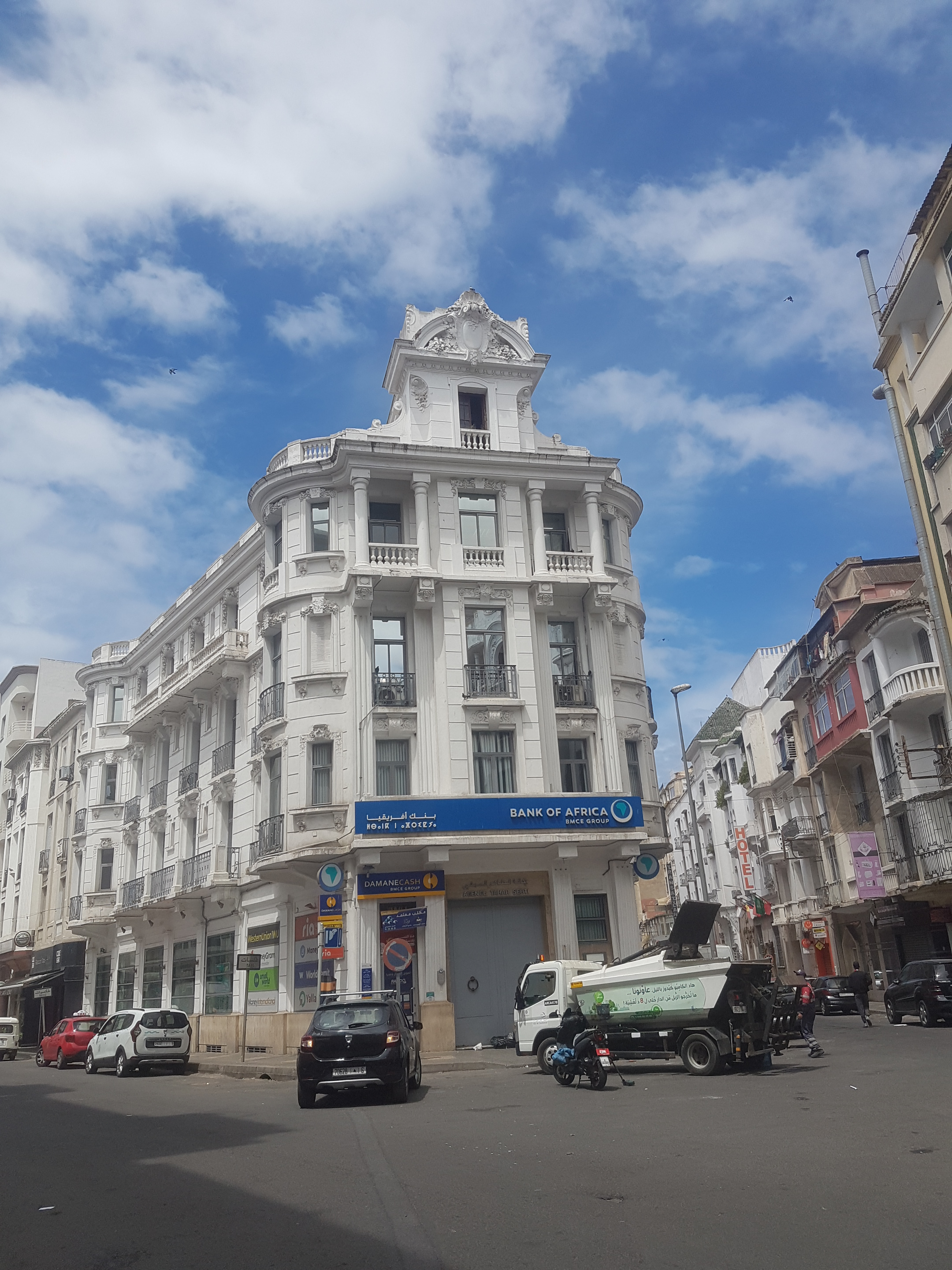
Former branch in Casablanca

- 1905: BCI took a majority stake in the newly established Banque Commerciale Tunisienne.
- 1906: BCI participated in the augmentation of the capital of Banco Comerciale Italo-Brasiliano, which had been founded in 1900 as Banco Comerciale Italiano di S. Paolo.
- 1908: BCI took an important stake in Banca della Svizzera Italiana (BSI), which had been founded in 1873. In 1910 BCI took control of BSI.
- 1910: BCI established Banque Française et Italienne pour l'Amerique du Sud, later known as Sudameris. Sudameris took over the activities of Banco Comerciale Italo-Brasiliano, which was in liquidation.
- 1911: BSI established a branch in London.
- 1911: BSI liquidated Banque Commerciale Tunisienne, which was merged into Société Générale de l'Afrique du Nord.
- 1918: BCI established a branch in New York, and Banca Commerciale Italiana (France), in Paris. The French subsidiary would establish branches in Marseilles and Casablanca.
- 1919: BCI acquired or created four foreign operations. In Lima, Peru, it acquired a stake in Banco Italiano, which had been founded in 1889. It established Società Italiana de Credito Commerciale out of Società Generale Commissionaria, which had been founded in Italy in 1918 and which had a branch in Vienna. BCI created Banca Commerciale Italiana e Bulgara (Bulcomit) in Sofia, Bulgaria. Lastly, it established a branch in Istanbul.
- 1920: This was also a busy year for BCI's international expansion. It created Banca Ungaro-Italiano Bankunit) out of the merger of the Credit Instut Ungarscher Holzhändler e Ungarsche Landesbank and Agrar-Bank. It also established Banca Italiana e Romena (Romcomit) by assuming the branches in Transylvania of Banca Agrara Timisana. BCI also acquired a stake in Prague-based Böhmische Union Bank. Lastly, Società Italiana de Credito Commerciale changed its name to Società Italiana di Credito.
- 1923: BCI established Banco Italiano – Guayaquil in Ecuador.
- 1924: BCI established Banca Commerciale Italiana per l'Egitto (Comitegit) in Alexandria. A branch in Cairo would follow. In the US, BCI established Banca Commerciale Italiana Trust Co. – New York.
- 1927: BCI acquired a stake in Bank Handlowy w Warszawie, founded in 1870. However, BCI reduced its stake in Böhmische Union-Bank to a minority position.
- 1928: BCI established a branch in İzmir (that time called Smyrna).
- 1929: BCI established Banca Commerciale Italiana e Greca (Comitellas) in Athens. In the US, BCI established Banca Commerciale Italiana Trust Co. – Boston and Banca Commerciale Italiana Trust Co. – Philadelphia.
- 1930: BCI acquired a stake in Hrvatska Banks in Zagreb.
- 1934: BCI sold its shares in Società Italiana di Credito.
- 1935: BCI sold its stake in Bank Handlowy.
- 1937: BCI established a representative office in Belgrade, while closing Banca Commerciale Italiana Trust Co. – Boston.
- 1938: BCI liquidated Banca Commerciale Italiana Trust Co. – Philadelphia, having sold the business to Liberty Title and Trust Co.
- 1939: BCI sold Banca Commerciale Italiana Trust Co. – New York to Manufacturers Trust Co.
- 1940: BCI's branch in London was liquidated.
- 1941: BCI sold its shares in Banco Italiano – Guayaquil, which became Banco de Guayaquil. BCI's branch in New York was sequestrated and liquidated immediately after the United States declared war on Italy.
- 1942: Banco Italiano, in Lima, changed its name to Banco de Crédito del Perú.
- 1943: BCI closed its representative offices in Berlin and Belgrade.

== See also ==
- List of banks in Italy
