= Cassa di Risparmio delle Provincie Lombarde =

Former Italian bank

Cariplo
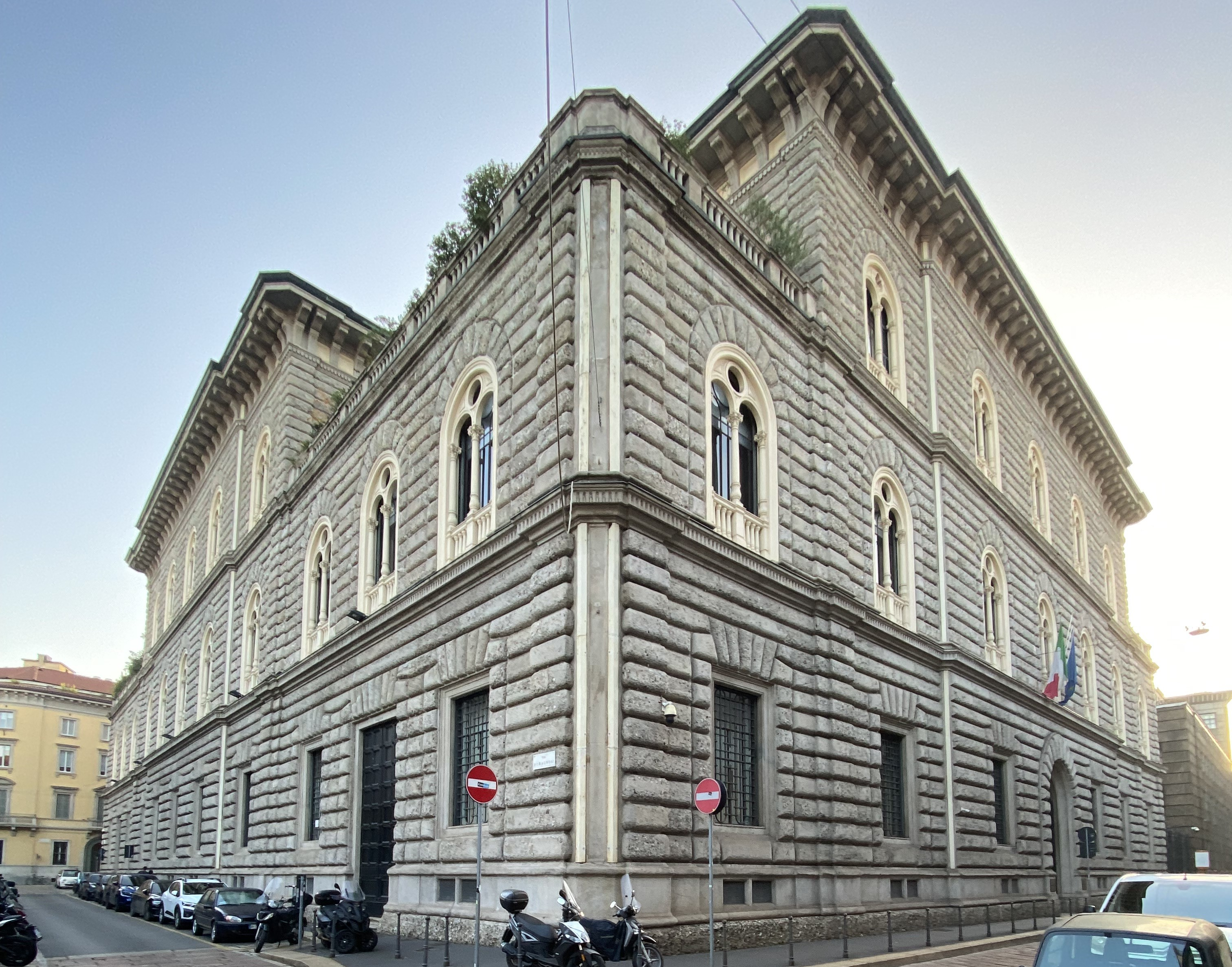
- The Ca' de Sass in Milan, head office of the Cassa di Risparmio delle Provincie Lombarde from 1872 to 1998
- Native name: Cassa di Risparmio delle Provincie Lombarde S.p.A.
- Company type: private società per Azioni
- Industry: Financial services
- Defunct: 1998
- Headquarters: Milan, Italy
- Subsidiaries: Mediocredito Lombardo

Cassa di Risparmio delle Provincie Lombarde, known in shorthand as Cariplo SpA, was an Italian bank founded in 1823. On 2 January 1998, it merged with Banco Ambrosiano Veneto to form Banca Intesa. Cariplo SpA became a short-lived sub-holding company of Intesa in late 1990s, and was fully absorbed circa 2000.

== History ==
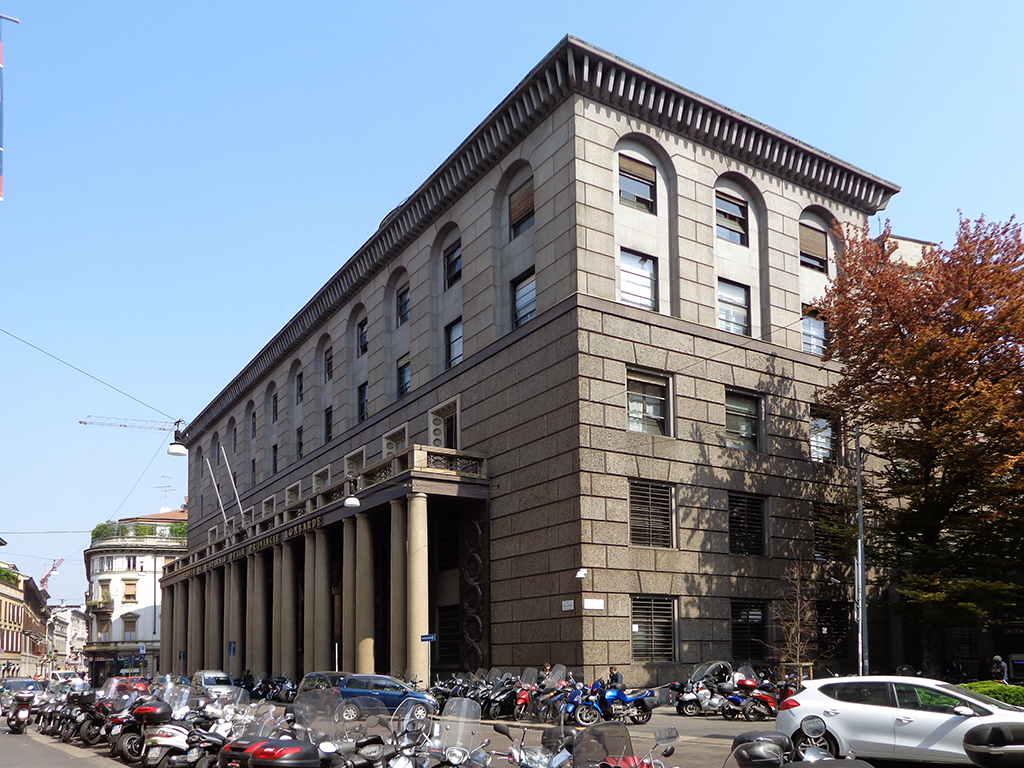
Palazzo delle Colonne, expansion of the Ca' de Sass completed in 1941 on a design by Giovanni Muzio and Giovanni Greppi

The bank was formed on 12 June 1823 by the count Giovanni Pietro Porro, in Kingdom of Lombardy–Venetia, decades before the unification of Italy. Situated in industrialized Northern Italy, the Lombard firm had become one of the major bank in Italy. In 1926 the bank absorbed Cassa di Risparmio di Voghera and Cassa di Risparmio di Novara in 1928.

In December 1991, due to Legge Amato, the bank, as società per azioni, and Fondazione Cariplo were formed to separate ownership, charity and daily banking operation.

The bank also started its own expansion strategy 1990s, which acquired shares of the saving banks of Alessandria, Carrara and Spezia to form Carinord Holding SpA in 1995, (Ca.Ri."Nord", a joint venture of the owners of Alessandria, Carrara and Spezia and Cariplo) as well as Calabria e Lucania (Carical), Puglia (Caripuglia), Salernitana (Carisal) (the formation of Banca Carime). In Marche, Fermo (33.3%), Ascoli (25%), Banca delle Marche (5.13%) were acquired. In Umbria, Spoleto, Città di Castello, Foligno (18.34%); in Lazio the province of Viterbo and Rieti; in Abruzzo Cassa di Risparmio della Provincia di Chieti, Cassa di Risparmio della Provincia di Teramo and Cassa di Risparmio di Pescara e Loreto Aprutino (20% each).

Other banks acquired were Banca Monte Parma (20.5%), German bank Bankhaus Löbbecke and Hungarian bank Európai Kereskedelmi Bank.

In 1997 Fondazione Cariplo and Cariverona agreed a deal on Banco Ambrosiano Veneto's shares, which led to the ultimate merger on 2 January 1998. On 30 September 1997 Fondazione Cariplo held 13.42% shares of Banco Ambrosiano Veneto and 100% shares of Cariplo SpA.

== See also ==
- Fondazione Cariplo
- List of banks in Italy
