= Banco Ambrosiano Veneto =

- Company type: Defunct
- Industry: Banking
- Predecessor: Nuovo Banco Ambrosiano, Banca Cattolica del Veneto
- Founded: 1989
- Defunct: 1998
- Fate: Merged with Cassa di Risparmio delle Provincie Lombarde (Cariplo) to form Banca Intesa in 1998
- Successor: Banca Intesa
- Headquarters: Italy
- Products: Financial services
- Parent: Crédit Agricole (minority shareholder)

Banco Ambrosiano Veneto, also known as Banco Ambroveneto for short, was an Italian bank formed in 1989 by the merger of Nuovo Banco Ambrosiano (the bank replacing the collapsed Banco Ambrosiano) with Banca Cattolica del Veneto.

Since 1989, Crédit Agricole also held a portion of shares of Banco Ambrosiano Veneto.

From 1991 until the merger in 1998, BAV acquired Banca Vallone di Galatin, Citibank Italia (later named Banco Ambroveneto Sud), Società di Banche Siciliane, Banca Massicana di Sessa Aurunca, Banca di Trento e Bolzano and Caboto.

The newly formed bank continued operation until 1998, when it agreed with the Cassa di Risparmio delle Provincie Lombarde (Cariplo) to form the Banca Intesa.

60 branches under the brand of Banco Ambroveneto, located in Friuli-Venezia Giulia, were transferred to FriulAdria as an intragroup transaction in 2000.

== See also ==
- List of banks in Italy

== Sources ==
- michaelpage.com
