= MPS =

MPS, M.P.S., MPs, or mps may refer to:

== Science and technology ==
- Mucopolysaccharidosis, genetic lysosomal storage disorder
- Mononuclear phagocyte system, cells in mammalian biology
- Myofascial pain syndrome
- Metallopanstimulin
- Potassium peroxymonosulfate, oxidizer commonly used for pools and spas
- Metre per second (m/s)
- Matrix product state, method to describe quantum many-body states
- Marginal propensity to save
- Mean-preserving spread, in probability and statistics
- Mail Preference Service, the Robinson list direct mail opt-out system
- Master Production Schedule, plan for individual commodities to be produced
- Method Performance Specifications, for analytical validation/verification of laboratory tests and systems required by the College of American Pathologists
- Myofibrillar Protein Synthesis

=== Computing ===
- Mobile Programming System, by William Waite in the 1960s
- JetBrains MPS, Meta Programming System
- MPS (format), the Mathematical Programming System, a computer file format used to describe mathematical programming problems
- MultiProcessor Specification, Intel specification for multi-processor computers of x86 architecture
- Moving Particle Semi-implicit Method, a computational method for the simulation of incompressible free surface flows
- Messages per second, sent or received by a market data system; See Options Price Reporting Authority
- Minimum Population Search, a computational method that optimizes a problem by iteratively trying to improve a set of candidate solutions
- Metal Performance Shaders, a collection of highly optimized compute and graphics shaders designed to integrate into apps using Apple's Metal API.

== Language ==
- Mandarin Phonetic Symbols or Bopomofo (MPS I)
  - Mandarin Phonetic Symbols II

== Organizations ==
- Banca Monte dei Paschi di Siena, the oldest extant bank, in Italy
  - MPS Finance, a defunct subsidiary of Banca Monte dei Paschi di Siena
  - MPS Capital Services, a subsidiary of Banca Monte dei Paschi di Siena
- Malmin Palloseura, association football club in Helsinki, Finland
- Mathematical Programming Society, mathematical society dedicated to optimization
- Max Planck Institute for Solar System Research in Germany
- Medical Protection Society, supplying legal and ethics support to health professionals
- Metropolitan Police Service of Greater London, England
- Mont Pelerin Society, international organization favoring economic liberalism
- MPS Records, Musik Produktion Schwarzwald (Music Production Black Forest), a jazz record label
- Monolithic Power Systems, an international semiconductor company

=== Politics ===
- Ministry of Social Security (Brazil), (Portuguese: Ministério da Previdência Social)
- Ministry of Public Security (disambiguation) of several countries:
  - Ministry of Public Security of the People's Republic of China
- Ministerstvo Putey Soobshcheniya (Ministry of the Means of Communication) in Russian-language jurisdictions:
  - Ministry of the Means of Communication (Soviet Union)
- Member of the Pharmaceutical Society of Australia
- Mouvement Patriotique de Salut, a political party in Chad
- Selayang Municipal Council (Malay: Majlis Perbandaran Selayang), a municipal council governing the Gombak District, Malaysia

=== Education ===
- Michael Park School, Waldorf school located in Auckland, New Zealand
- Maheshwari Public School, Jaipur, India
- Marymount Primary School, Hong Kong, China

==== United States ====
- Miss Porter's School, an all-girls preparatory school in Farmington, Connecticut
- Minneapolis Public Schools, large school district in the state of Minnesota
- Milwaukee Public Schools, largest public education district in the state of Wisconsin
- Mercyhurst Preparatory School, high school in Erie, Pennsylvania
- Midland Public Schools, school district in Midland, Michigan
- Millard Public Schools, school district in Omaha, Nebraska
- Montgomery Public Schools, a school district in Montgomery County, Alabama
- Miami Public Schools, Miami, Oklahoma

== Other uses ==
- Members of Parliament (MPs)
- Master of Professional Studies, a terminal master's degree
- Meet-the-People Sessions, where citizens meet their members of parliament in Singapore
- Multiple Property Submission, to the US National Register of Historic Places
- Master production schedule, a plan for individual commodities to be produced
- Mazda Performance Series, Mazdaspeed European version.
- ssmypics.scr, a screensaver for Microsoft Windows
- Member of the Preferred Sex
- Marginal price auction (from Marginal Price System)
- Multiple Personality Syndrome, an obsolete term for Dissociative identity disorder
- M. P. Sivagnanam, Indian writer and politician, known simply by his initials M. P. S.
- Mario Party Superstars, a 2021 party video game for the Nintendo Switch

== Transport ==
- MPS, the IATA code for Mount Pleasant Regional Airport, Texas
- MPS, the MRT station abbreviation for MacPherson MRT station, Singapore

== See also ==
- MP (disambiguation) for topics where "MPS" is treated as the plural form
