= Banca di Cambiano =

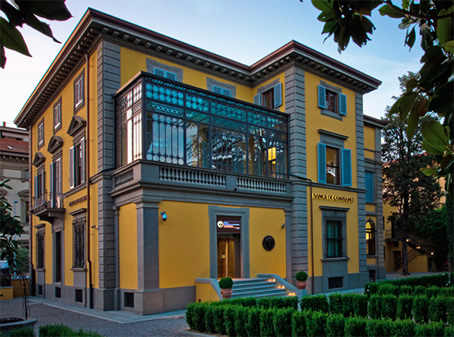
- Native name: Banca di Credito Cooperativo di Cambiano (Castelfiorentino–Firenze) S.C.p.A.
- Formerly: Cassa Rurale ed Artigiana di Cambiano
- Company type: Società Cooperativa per Azioni
- Industry: Financial services
- Founded: 20 April 1884 in Cambiano frazione, Castelfiorentino
- Headquarters: 6 Piazza Giovanni XXIII, Castelfiorentino, Italy
- Number of locations: ▲32 branches (2014)
- Area served: Tuscany
- Services: Retail banking
- Net income: ▲€4.9 million (2014)
- Total assets: ▲€3,120,741,736 (2014)
- Total equity: ▲€278,068,053 (2014)
- Owner: 3,160 individuals (2014)
- Number of employees: ▲288 (2014)
- Website: Official website (in Italian)
- Footnotes / references source

Banca di Credito Cooperativo di Cambiano (Castelfiorentino–Firenze) S.C.p.A. known as Banca di Cambiano is an Italian bank based in Castelfiorentino, Tuscany region. The bank served the Tuscan provinces of Florence, Pisa, Siena, Pistoia and Arezzo. The bank was a cooperative bank.

== History ==
The bank was found in 1884, which was the oldest surviving rural credit union of Italy (several Banca Popolare (credit union in urban area) found before 1884 and Loreggia was the home of first rural credit union of Italy); the oldest member of Federazione Italiana delle Banche di Credito Cooperativo - Casse Rurali ed Artigiane (Federcasse) was Cassa Rurale ed Artigiana di Boves found 1888. (Banca di Cambiano did not join the Federcasse.)

In 2016 the bank demutualized.

== Equity interests ==
The bank was a minority owner of ICCREA Banca and Fidi Toscana. The bank also formed a joint venture Cabel Holding (38.53% stake) along with other cooperative banks in Tuscany, Lazio and Veneto: Banca di Credito Cooperativo di Castagneto Carducci (28.90%), Banca di Pisa e Fornacette Credito Cooperativo (28.80%), Banca di Viterbo Credito Cooperativo (2.01%), Banca Popolare di Lajatico (~1%), Banca Popolare di Cortona, Banca Popolare del Frusinate, Banca di Credito Cooperativo Vicentino di Pojana Maggiore and Cerea Banca 1897 (in subsidiaries of Cabel Holding only).

== See also ==
- Banca Monte dei Paschi di Siena
- Cassa di Risparmio di Lucca Pisa Livorno
- Banca CR Firenze
