= Death of David Rossi =

2013 death in Italy

The death of David Rossi occurred on 6 March 2013 in Siena, Italy. Rossi, head of communications of Banca Monte dei Paschi di Siena, was found dead on the street outside his office in Rocca Salimbeni. Since the event, the circumstances around his death have been subject to considerable dispute. In 2024, a parliamentary commission is reinvestigating the death.

== Circumstances ==
In January 2013, Banca Monte dei Paschi di Siena, the world's oldest bank, asked the Italian government for a taxpayer bailout. The bank was in crisis after suffering severe losses and feared the financial institution would collapse after 540 years of business. On 19 February 2013, investigators from the Italian Financial Police searched Rossi's office and house, as well as those of the former president and the former general manager of Rocca Salimbeni, Giuseppe Mussari and Antonio Vigni. The inquiry dealt with the acquisition of Banca Antonveneta, one of the catalysts for the bank's near collapse the month before. Rossi was not personally under investigation, and no charges were brought against him.

== Investigations ==
On 6 March 2013, David Rossi, born in Siena on 2 June 1961, was found underneath his open office window at the bank's headquarters in Siena and died shortly after. The immediate speculation was of an apparent suicide. After discovering the body, the public prosecutor of Siena investigated the event. Previously two other inquiries had been carried out, which came to the verdict of suicide, even though many elements were never clarified. Only one of the twelve available surveillance cameras could verify the facts.

In July 2013, the widow of Rossi, Antonella Tognazzi, was investigated and then brought to trial, together with journalist Davide Vecchi (at the time envoy of il Fatto Quotidiano), through an own-initiative procedure by magistrate Aldo Natalini, on suspicion of privacy violation: it was the first and only court case in Italy, according to the abstracts of the Court of Cassation. The trial has been the subject of many controversies, which lead to some parliamentary questions and the intervention of international observatory on press freedom at Columbia University of New York, as it was considered an attempt to restrict the right to information. The lawsuit was concluded in January 2018, with the full acquittal and a harsh sentence by judge Alessio Innocenti, who condemned the opening of the investigation file charged to Tognazzi and Vecchi.

== Controversies ==
The television show Le Iene strongly highlighted the case, pointing out that some of the people involved had attended several sex parties. Due to this, the public prosecutor of Genova launched an investigation, searched an envoy of the show Le Iene and collected some documents in his possession. During the investigation, it turned out that Rossi's watch was not on his wrist at the moment of the fall, but it was thrown out of his office window twenty minutes later. A magistrate who was investigating the incident was threatened with death when a 9mm handgun bullet was delivered to him. Camera footage showed that two people approached Rossi while he was still alive but walked away shortly after, without aiding him. In 2020, as a result of the dismissed investigations, the public prosecutor of Genova started investigating the magistrates who were involved in the case to ascertain the correct execution of the activities.

== Parliamentary Committee ==
On 11 March 2021, the Chamber of Deputies established the Parliamentary Committee of Inquiry on the death of David Rossi, tasked with precisely reconstructing the facts, causes and reasons which led to the death of Rossi and possible third-party responsibilities. The committee is chaired by the Forza Italia deputy Pierantonio Zanettin. The final report was submitted on 15 September 2022, but the results were disputed. On 22 March 2023, a new parliamentary commission was established, beginning their work on 5 March 2024.

== 2024–2026 parliamentary commission findings ==
After 42 plenary sessions and testimony from 33 individuals, the commission approved its interim report on 3 March 2026, unanimously ruling out suicide. Forensic analysis by the RIS (Reparto Investigazioni Scientifiche, the Carabinieri's forensic science unit) concluded that Rossi had been suspended outside his office window and held by both wrists by third parties before the fall. A second expert opinion found facial injuries sustained just before the fall incompatible with self-harm. The motive has yet to be established. The Siena public prosecutor's office has reopened an investigative file in parallel.
