= Fidi Toscana =

- Native name: Fidi Toscana S.p.A.
- Company type: public private joint venture
- Industry: Financial services
- Founded: 1974
- Headquarters: 46 Viale G. Mazzini, Florence, Italy
- Key people: Lorenzo Petretto (chairman)
- Services: development bank
- Net income: ▲ (€3,560,205) (2014)
- Total assets: ▲€329,542,747 (2014)
- Total equity: ▼€166,959,183 (2014)
- Owner: Tuscany region (46.2844%); Banca MPS (27.4595%); Banca CR Firenze (8.3598%); BNL (3.9177%); others
- Capital ratio: 17.20% (Tier 1)
- Website: Official website
- Footnotes / references source

Fidi Toscana S.p.A. is the in-house development bank of Tuscany region, Italy. The bank allocates and distributes development funding to businesses in the region. The bank is significantly owned by Tuscany region, plus minority interests from the provinces and comunes of the region, local chambers of commerce, major and minor banks, and other public institutes (Assoturismo, Confederazione Italiana Agricoltori, Confindustria Toscana, Confartigianato Toscana, Confcommercio - Unione Regionale Toscana, Confcooperative – Unione Regionale Toscana, etc.)

The bank was registered under article 107 of Testo Unico Bancario (Italian banking law).

== History ==
In 1998 Fidi Agricola was absorbed into Fidi Toscana.

== See also ==
- Mediocredito Toscano
