= Cattolica (disambiguation) =

Cattolica may refer to:

- Cattolica, a town in the Province of Rimini, Italy
- Cattolica Eraclea, a town in Sicily
- Cattolica Assicurazioni, Italian insurance company
- Cattolica Popolare, a cooperative corporation
- Banca Cattolica del Veneto, defunct Italian bank
- Banca Cattolica di Molfetta, defunct Italian bank
- Banca Cattolica di Montefiascone, defunct Italian bank
- Università Cattolica del Sacro Cuore, an Italian private research university

== See also ==
- Catholic (disambiguation)
