= Fondazione Banca Agricola Mantovana =

Italian charity organization based in Mantua, Lombardy

Fondazione BAM
- Fondazione Banca Agricola Mantovana
- Named after: Banca Agricola Mantovana
- Predecessor: Charity function of Banca Agricola Mantovana
- Formation: 13 October 2000
- Founder: Banca Agricola Mantovana; Banca Monte dei Paschi di Siena
- VAT ID no.: 93034380209
- Headquarters: 13 corso Vittorio Emanuele II, Mantua, Italy
- Revenue: €1,133,000 (2013)
- Expenses: €267,723 (2013)
- Endowment: €504,042 (to others)
- Website: Official website (in Italian)

Fondazione Banca Agricola Mantovana is an Italian charity organization based in Mantua, Lombardy. It was found by Banca Agricola Mantovana (BAM) and its parent company Banca Monte dei Paschi di Siena (Banca MPS) in 2000. BAM was transformed from a cooperative bank to a limited company (società per azioni) circa 1999–2000.

According to its by-law, BAM had to pay the foundation 2 billion lire (€1.033 million) annually. Since the bank was absorbed into Banca MPS in 2008, Banca MPS inherited the responsibility instead. However, Banca MPS refused to honor the contract. In 2015 the foundation seek arbitration for the non-payment for three years.

In the past BAM had rights to name 5 directors, while other 4 directors were named by the comune of Mantua, the Province of Mantua and the Accademia Nazionale Virgiliana.

== Headquarter ==
The headquarter of the foundation was located in Palazzo del Diavolo, 15 corso Vittorio Emanuele II. The building was the old headquarter of the bank. However, the bank moved to 30 corso Vittorio Emanuele II in 1949, which currently a branch of Banca MPS. Palazzo del Diavolo was opposite to a branch of UniCredit (ex-Cariverona branch).

== Arts Gallery ==
The Galleria d'Arte of the foundation displayed the works of Giuseppe Bazzani: S.Margarita da Cortona and San Longino, Sant'Andrea, Sant'Elena con la reliquia del Preziosissimo Sangue as well as other collections.
