= MP =

MP, Mp, mp, or .mp may refer to:

== Arts and entertainment ==
=== Broadcasting ===
- Multipremier, a Mexican television network
- MusiquePlus, whose station identification is "mp"

=== Gaming ===
- Magic point, or mana point, in role-playing games
- Mario Party, a series of party video games produced by Nintendo
- Multiplayer, in a multiplayer video game
- "My Player" in NBA 2K games

=== Music ===
- Mike Portnoy, drummer of the progressive metal band Dream Theater
- Mezzo-piano (mp), a musical dynamic meaning "medium-quiet" or "moderately-quiet"
- M.P. (opera), an 1811 comic opera by Thomas Moore and Charles Edward Horn

=== Other media ===
- Margaret Preston, Australian artist who signed works "MP"
- Ming Pao, a Hong Kong newspaper

== Businesses and organizations ==
=== Government agencies ===
==== Police ====
- Military police, law enforcement agencies connected with, or part of, the military of a state
- Mumbai Police, the police force of the city of Mumbai, Maharashtra
- Municipal police, law enforcement agencies under the control of local government
  - Metropolitan police, municipal police of major metropolitan areas

==== Other government agencies ====
- Ministry of Planning, Budget, and Management (Brazil), a cabinet-level federal ministry in Brazil
- Public Ministry (Portugal) (Portuguese: Ministério Público), the body of the Judiciary of Portugal
- Public Prosecutor's Office (Brazil) (Portuguese: Ministério Público), the Brazilian body of independent public prosecutors

=== Political parties ===
- Progressive Movement (Cameroon) (French: Mouvement Progressiste), a minor opposition political party in Cameroon
- Green Party (Sweden) (Swedish: Miljöpartiet), a political party in Sweden based upon green politics

=== Other businesses and organizations ===
- Martinair (IATA airline designator MP), Dutch cargo airline
- Mikkelin Palloilijat, a Finnish football (soccer) club
- Ming Pao, a Hong Kong newspaper
- Missouri Pacific Railroad (reporting mark MP), one of the first railroads in the US west of the Mississippi River
- MyProtein, British online sports nutrition retailer

== Law ==
- Manu propria, a Latin expression meaning by one's own hand
- Provisory measure, in Brazilian law (Portuguese: medida provisória)
- Missing person
- Member of Parliament in various countries, including:
  - Member of Parliament (Australia), individual elected to serve in the House of Commons of Australia
  - Member of Parliament (Bangladesh), individual elected to serve in the Jatiya Sangsad of Bangladesh
  - Member of Parliament (Canada), individual elected to serve in the House of Commons of the Parliament of Canada
  - Member of Parliament (India), individual elected to serve in the Lok Sabha or Rajya Sabha of the Parliament of India
  - Member of Parliament (New Zealand), individual elected to serve in the House of Commons of New Zealand
  - Member of Parliament (South Africa), individual elected to serve in the House of Commons of the Parliament of South Africa
  - Member of Parliament (Sri Lanka), individual elected to serve in the Parliament of Sri Lanka
  - Member of Parliament (United Kingdom), individual elected to serve in the House of Commons of the Parliament of the UK

== Linguistics ==
- Mp (digraph), in many African languages
- Malayo-Polynesian languages of Southeast Asia
- Minimalist program, a syntactic theory in linguistics

== People ==
- Michael Peterson (surfer) (1952–2012), Australian surfer
- Mike Portnoy, drummer of the progressive metal band Dream Theater
- Margaret Preston, Australian artist who signed her works "MP"

== Places ==
- Madhya Pradesh, a state in India
- Manipur Pradesh, a term used to refer to Manipur by various political parties
- Marine Parade, a Singaporean town
- Mandatory Palestine, a former British protectorate
- Northern Mariana Islands (ISO 3166-1 alpha-2 country code and U.S. postal abbreviation MP), an insular area and commonwealth of the US

== Science and technology ==
=== Biology and medicine ===
- Macrophage, a type of white blood cell that engulfs and digests cellular debris, foreign substances, microbes and cancer cells
- Meralgia paraesthetica (MP), a sensation of numbness in the outer thigh
- Methylphenidate, a stimulant medication
- Movement protein, proteins encoded by plant viruses to facilitate cell-to-cell transmission

=== Computing ===
- .mp, Internet country code top-level domain (ccTLD) for Northern Mariana Islands
- Management Point, in the Advanced Client of Microsoft's System Center Configuration Manager
- Massive parallelism (disambiguation)
- Media player (disambiguation)
- Media processor, a type of digital signal processor designed to deal with streaming data in real-time
- Megapixel, a unit of a million pixels
- Merge Point, in the MPLS local protection approach to network resiliency
- Microprocessor, a computer processor with a minimal number of integrated circuits
- Microsoft Project, project-management software
- Multilink Protocol (or Multilink PPP), a method for spreading traffic across multiple point-to-point protocol connections
- Multi-platform, describing software that is implemented on multiple computer platforms
- Multiprocessing, the use of two or more central processing units within a single computer system

=== Mathematics ===
- Maximum parsimony (phylogenetics), in statistical analysis
- Modus ponens, in propositional logic, a Latin expression meaning "mode that affirms"

=== Physics ===
- Megapond (Mp), a non-SI Metric unit of force, also known as a tonne-force
- Melting point, the temperature at which a solid becomes a liquid
- m_{p}, the mass of a proton

=== Other uses in science and technology ===
- Machine pistol, typically a handgun-style machine gun, capable of fully automatic or burst fire
- Mammal Paleogene zone, a system of biostratigraphic zones in the stratigraphic record
- Microprinting (MP), a method of printing very finely as an anti-counterfeiting mechanism
- Middle Paleolithic, an archaeological period
- Minimalist program, a syntactic theory in linguistics
- Møller–Plesset perturbation theory, a post-Hartree–Fock method used in computational chemistry
- Monoprinting (M/P), a type of printmaking producing a single print

== Sport ==
- Mikkelin Palloilijat (MP), a Finnish football club
- MP Motorsport, a Dutch auto racing team
- MP Promotions, a Filipino boxing promotional company

== Other uses ==
- Marka polska, a historical Polish money unit
- Masterpoints, awarded for successful performance at contract bridge; see Glossary of contract bridge terms
- Matchpoints, a method of scoring in contract bridge; see Glossary of contract bridge terms
- Mile post
- Roman mile (Latin: mille passuum)

== See also ==
- MP, a brand of Russian firearms by Izhevsk Mechanical Plant, including:
  - MP-71
  - MP-412 REX
  - MP-443 Grach, (Pistolet Yarygina)
  - MP-444 (Bagira)
  - MP-445 (Varyag)
  - MP-446 Viking
  - MP-448 Skyph
- MP, one of several models of rubber-tyred rolling stock on the Paris Metro, notably:
  - MP 73
  - MP 89
  - MP 05
  - MP 14 (Paris Metro)
- File formats developed by the Moving Picture Experts Group (MPEG):
  - MP1
  - MP2
  - MP3
  - MP4
- MPS (disambiguation)
  - Metropolitan Police Service (MPS), the police force of Greater London
- Metacarpophalangeal joint (MCP), situated between the metacarpal bones and the proximal phalanges of the digits
