= Fondazione Monte dei Paschi di Siena =

Italian banking foundation

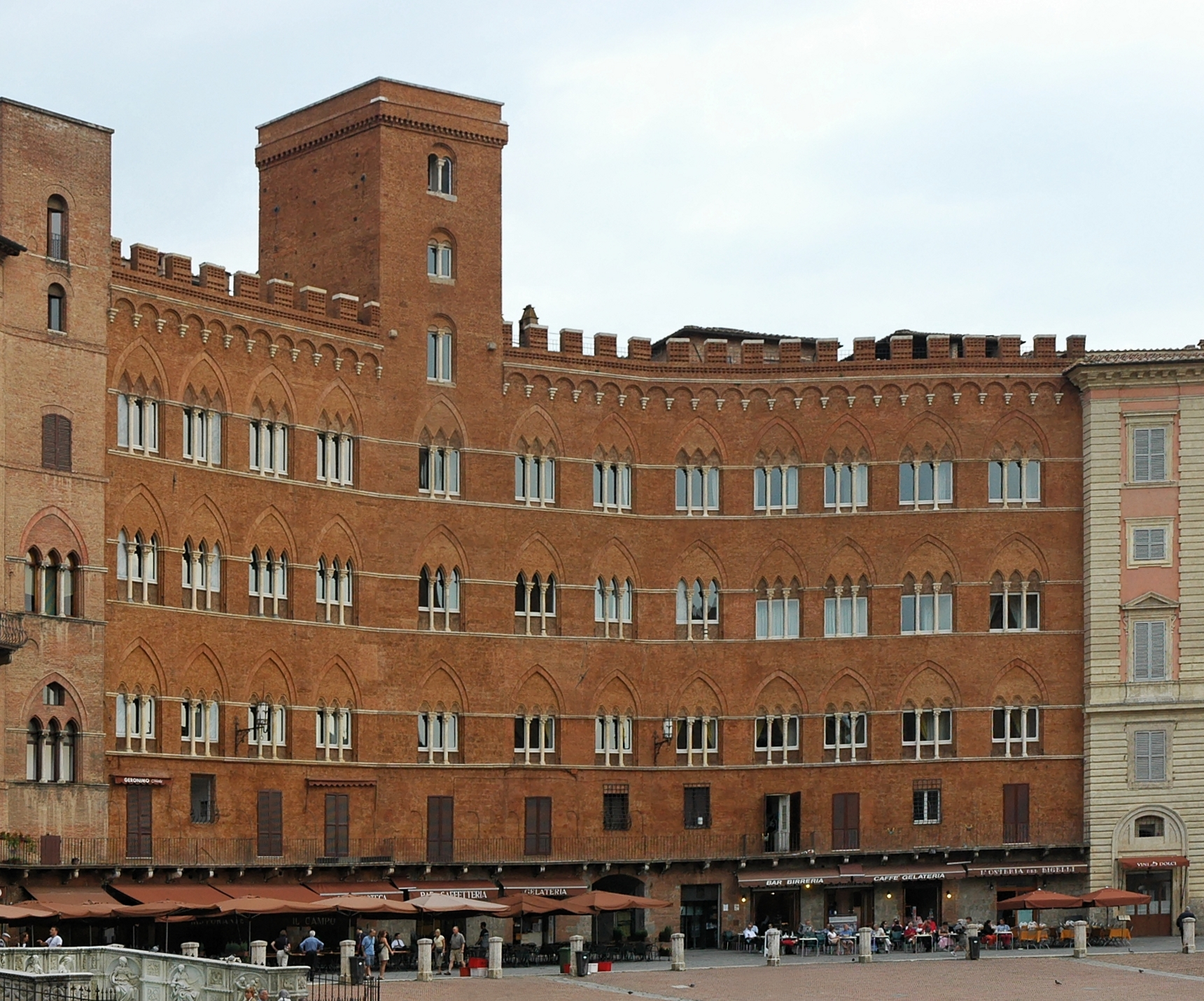
- Palazzo Sansedoni, seat of Fondazione Monte dei Paschi di Siena
- Predecessor: Charity function of Banca Monte dei Paschi di Siena
- Founded: 28 August 1995
- Headquarters: 34 Banchi di Sotto, Siena, Italy
- Key people: Carlo Rossi (Chairman)
- Total assets: € 543,836,006 (2020)
- Website: fondazionemps.it

Fondazione Monte dei Paschi di Siena (FMPS) is a philanthropic organization based in Siena, Tuscany, Italy. The foundation was in fact the original statutory corporation of Monte dei Paschi di Siena. Due to Legge Amato, in 1995 there was a separation: Banca Monte dei Paschi di Siena became the company controlling the banking business, meanwhile the statutory corporation became Fondazione MPS, a foundation and private legal person which held the bank's shares.

Since the 1936 statute 16 members of the Fondazione Monte dei Paschi di Siena were appointed by local authorities: 8 members by the municipality of Siena, 5 by the province of Siena, 1 by the University of Siena, 1 by the Tuscany region and the latter by Archdioceses of Siena, Colle Val d'Elsa and Montalcino. The Foundation appoints the MPS governing body whose governance and operativity has been highly influenced by the Italian politic since the 20th century.

== History ==
The foundation was the major shareholders of Banca Monte dei Paschi di Siena.

As of December 31, 1996, FMPS reported total assets of €2,696,800,000. Between 1999 and 2000, FMPS's assets began substantially increasing as an effect of the bank's public listing in the stock market.

As of December 31, 2007, assets were €6,380,083,884, 30% of which was capital in Banca Monte dei Paschi di Siena. During 2008, the foundation injected new capital into the bank, as Banca Monte dei Paschi di Siena issued new shares to finance its acquisition of Banca Antonveneta from Banco Santander. As of December 31, 2008, assets were €6,721,533,109, but now the investment in Banca Monte dei Paschi di Siena represented more than 70% of it, a huge increase from the previous year which represented an inversion away from the trend of prudent diversification that was taking place in prior years. At this point, FMPS's stake in Banca Monte dei Paschi di Siena was €4,805,805,166 and included 45.9% of all ordinary shares. The foundation also owned a 0.84% stake in Sanpaolo IMI in 2006.

However, in the following years, the bank would suffer huge losses from non-performing loans, derivative contracts. Its market capitalization fell and it was forced to recapitalize multiple times by issuing new shares.

FMPS's assets fell to €2,562,696,198 as of December 31, 2011. The foundation failed to purchase all the new shares assigned issued by Banca Monte dei Paschi, and also started selling shares, so its stake in the bank also dropped. As of December 31, 2013, assets were €1,205,497,787.

In 2014, the foundation sold most of the stake it held in Monte dei Paschi; 3,621,277,308 shares sold for about €0.2352 per share. On March 31 the foundation also formed a shareholders' agreement with Fintech Advisory and BTG Pactual Europe, a subsidiary of BTG Pactual. In the agreement, 5.48% voting rights of BMPS would vote collectively. After another capital increase, the agreement would only bind for 0.498% stake. As of December 31, FMPS's stake in the bank was valued at just €85,864,810, 12.91% of total assets, €0.67128 per shares times 127,912,863. 2014's total assets were €664,776,767 as of December 31.

ACRI, a trade association of savings banks and banking foundation, signed a memorandum of understanding with the Ministry of Economy and Finance for the new regulation on the assets of the foundations in 2015. The new regulations require the foundation to not invest more than one-third of the assets in a single entity.

As at December 31, 2015, total assets were €561,049,998. FMPS also owned all the units of Quaestio's Quaestio Capital Fund Global Diversified I Fund, which had a net asset value of approximately €236,000,000 at that time.

As of 31 December 2020, the foundation reported on its balance sheets assets of €543,836,006, down almost 92% from 2008's all-time high, and down almost 80% from 1996's starting point. Of these assets 6.4% was mostly real estate, 10.1% representing liquidity ready to be deployed and 82.9% representing financial assets FMPS is invested in, managed in part by Quaestio Capital Management SGR and in part by the foundation itself, also including mission related assets. The stake in Banca Monte dei Paschi di Siena's capital dropped to just 0.003% of the bank's shares, an almost insignificant amount of FMPS's assets.
