= Santander México =

Mexican bank

- Santander Group logo
- Native name: Banco Santander México S.A., Institución de Banca Múltiple, Grupo Financiero Santander México
- Type: public
- Traded as: NYSE: BSMX; BMV: BSMX
- Industry: Financial services
- Founded: 14 November 1991; 34 years ago
- Headquarters: 500 Avenida Prolongación Paseo de la Reforma, Colonia Lomas de Santa Fe, Álvaro Obregón, Mexico City, Mexico
- Key people: Héctor Grisi Checa (Chairman and CEO)
- Services: Retail and corporate banking
- Owner: Banco Santander (74.97%)
- Parent: Banco Santander
- Subsidiaries: Banco Santander (México) S.A. (99.99%); Casa de Bolsa Santander S.A. (99.99%)
- Website: Official website (in Spanish)

Grupo Financiero Santander México, S.A.B. de C.V. is a Mexican banking group and a subsidiary of Spanish bank Banco Santander.

== History ==
The Mexican banking group Grupo Financiero InverMexico was founded in 1991. In 1997, the group was renamed Grupo Financiero Santander Mexicano, after the group was acquired by Banco Santander. In 1998, the group merged with Grupo Financiero Santander Mexico. In 2000, the group merged with sister group Grupo Financiero Serfin. The group was renamed to Grupo Financiero Santander Serfin in 2001.

In 2003, Bank of America purchased 24.9% stake of the group from parent company Banco Santander of Spain. In 2006, the group renamed again as Grupo Financiero Santander, S.A. de C.V. and later that year as Grupo Financiero Santander, S.A.B. de C.V. (publicly traded variable capital corporation).

== Subsidiaries ==
=== Banco Santander (México) ===
Banco Santander (México) S.A. was founded on November 16, 1932, under the name Banco Mexicano. In 1955 Sociedad Mexicana de Crédito Industrial (Banco Somex) purchased a controlling interests of the bank. In 1958 Banco Mexicano merged with Banco Español. In 1979 the bank changed its name to Banco Mexicano Somex. In 1982 banks were nationalized. In 1992 InverMexico acquired Banco Mexicano. In 1996 the group was acquired by Banco Santander. In 2001 the bank was renamed as Banco Santander Mexicano.

In 2004 Banco Santander Mexicano and Banca Serfin were merged to form Banco Santander Serfin. In 2008 it was renamed as Banco Santander (México).

=== Banca Serfin ===
In 1977 Banco de Londres y México merged with Compañía General de Aceptaciones to form Banca Serfin. In 1992 the bank was acquired by Operadora de Bolsa and Banco Santander in 2000. The bank became defunct after a merger with Banco Santander Mexicano in 2004.
