= MPS Capital Services =

- Native name: MPS Capital Services – Banca per le Imprese S.p.A.
- Formerly: Mediocredito Toscano; MPS Merchant – Banca per Piccole e Medie Imprese; MPS Banca per l'Impresa
- Type: Subsidiary; (Società per Azioni)
- Industry: Financial services
- Founded: 1954; 72 years ago
- Headquarters: 4 Via Pancaldo, Florence, Italy
- Area served: Italy
- Key people: Mario Salvestroni (chairman); Giorgio Pernici (general manager)
- Services: Corporate and investment banking
- Net income: ▲6.1 million (2015)
- Total assets: ▼€42.7 billion (2015)
- Total equity: ▲€1.8 billion (2015)
- Owners: Banca MPS (99.97%); INAIL (0.01%); others (0.02%)
- Parent: Banca MPS
- Capital ratio: ▲13.955% (CET1, February 2016 in pro forma)
- Website: mpscapitalservices.it

MPS Capital Services (MPSCS) is an Italian corporate and investment bank based in Florence, Tuscany. The bank is a subsidiary of Banca Monte dei Paschi di Siena (Banca MPS). The subsidiary was known as MPS Banca per l'Impresa until 2007.

On 28 March 2012 the bank was one of the banks that were selected to manage Fondo di Garanzia per le Piccole e Medie Imprese (a guarantee fund for SMEs) of the Italian Ministry of Economic Development in a 9-year contract. (other banks were Mediocredito Italiano, Artigiancassa, Istituto Centrale delle Banche Popolari Italiane and Banca del Mezzogiorno – MedioCredito Centrale)

== History ==
MPS Banca per l'Impresa was a merger of the two subsidiaries of Banca Monte dei Paschi di Siena: MPS Merchant and MPS Banca Verde (ex-Istituto Federale di Credito Agrario per la Toscana or Istituto Nazionale di Credito Agrario S.p.A. (INCA)) in 2004. The history of MPS Merchant – Banca per Piccole e Medie Impresse (found 2001) could be traced back to Mediocredito Toscano, found 1954. In 2007 the bank received a division of MPS Finance and renamed into MPS Capital Services Banca per le Imprese.

=== Mediocredito Toscano ===
Mediocredito Toscano was a bank established in 1954 to provide medium term loan to small and medium companies of Tuscany region, as a statutory corporation. 18 other Mediocredito were also established in the 1950s for the 19 regions of Italy. Due to legal changes from the Legge Amato the bank became a limited company (Italian: Società per Azioni), which Monte dei Paschi di Siena (MPS) owned 74% stake. The Mediocredito also merged with Istituto Nazionale di Credito per il Lavoro Italiano all'Estero S.p.A. that year.

In 1995 MPS also became a limited company (formation of Banca Monte dei Paschi di Siena and Fondazione Monte dei Paschi di Siena). In 2000 the Mediocredito was owned by Banca MPS (80.454% stake) and Banca Toscana (11.676% stake), a subsidiary of Banca MPS (57.278% stake plus 4.983% via Banca Agricola Mantovana (BAM); Banca MPS owned 51.487% stake of BAM). The two banks (BAM and Banca Toscana) were absorbed by Banca MPS in the 2000s.
