= Interbanca =

Italian merchant bank

- Formerly: GE Capital Interbanca
- Company type: Subsidiary
- Industry: Financial services
- Founded: 1961
- Defunct: 23 October 2017
- Fate: absorbed by the parent company
- Headquarters: Milan, Italy
- Services: corporate banking; leasing; factoring
- Net income: ▲ (€57 million) (2016)
- Total assets: ▼€2.204 billion (2016)
- Total equity: ▼€868 million (2016)
- Owner: Banca IFIS
- Number of employees: ▼202 (2016)
- Parent: Banca IFIS
Subsidiaries
IFIS Leasing	(100%)
IFIS Factoring	(100%)
IFIS Rental Services	(100%)
- Capital ratio: ▲37.4% (CET1)
- Website: bancaifisimpresa.it
- Footnotes / references in separate balance sheet

Interbanca S.p.A. was an Italian merchant bank that specializes in lending and financing transactions for medium-sized firms. Its headquarters are in Milan and it has 10 branches in major cities throughout Italy.

Following a series of acquisitions in the Italian banking industry, Interbanca became a subsidiary of Banco Santander. In March 2008, the bank was purchased by GE Commercial Finance and renamed to GE Capital Interbanca. It was sold to Banca IFIS in November 2016, as part of a strategy by GE to reduce its financial services division. The bank is under Banca IFIS Impresa division of the group.

== History ==
A consortium of banks comprising Banco Ambrosiano, Banca d'America e d'Italia, and Banca Nazionale dell'Agricoltura, founded Interbanca – Banca per i Finanziamenti a Medio Termine in 1961. By 1997 it had come under the control of Banca Antonveneta, which in 1999 acquired Banca Nazionale dell'Agricoltura. In June 1999, its parent listed Interbanca on the stock exchange, but then in February 2003 wholly acquired it.

In 2006, ABN AMRO acquired Antonveneta, only to be itself acquired by a consortium consisting of The Royal Bank of Scotland Group, Fortis, and Santander. Banco Santander took control of Antonveneta in October 2007 and sold it on to Banca Monte dei Paschi di Siena in November at a 36% premium over the valuation for the acquisition. Although Banco Santander had sold Antonveneta, it retained Interbanca for the time being.

In March 2008, Santander sold Interbanca to GE Commercial Finance, receiving in return GE Money businesses in Germany, Finland and Austria, and GE's Card and Auto Financing Businesses in the UK.

In May 2015, GE appointed the Deutsche Bank to sell the Interbanca, then had a net assets of over €1,000,000,000.

In 2016 Banca IFIS acquired Interbanca for €160 million, with an obligation to repay the inter-company debt, totalling €2.1 billion, to GE.

Interbanca was merged with the parent company Banca IFIS on 23 October 2017.

== See also ==
- List of banks in Italy
