= Openbank =

Spanish direct online bank

Open Bank, S.A.
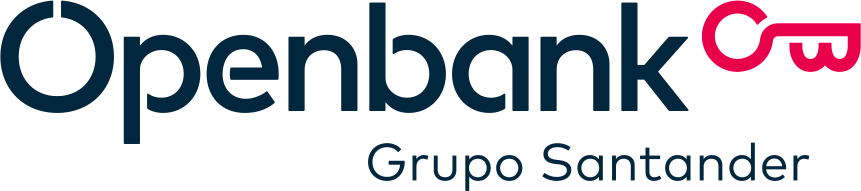

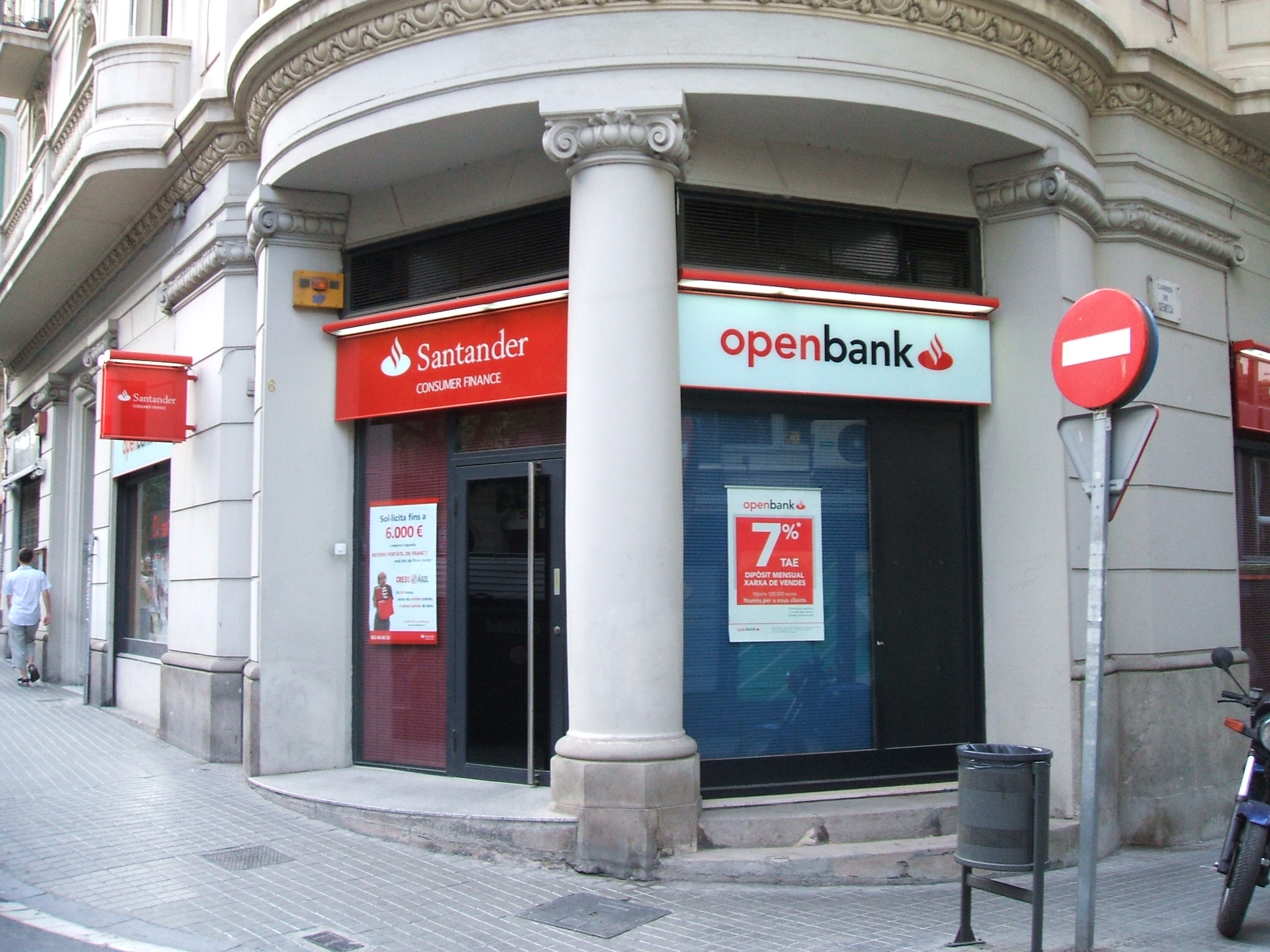
- Openbank branch, Barcelona
- Type: Sociedad Anónima
- Industry: Financial services
- Founded: 1995; 31 years ago
- Headquarters: Madrid, Spain
- Area served: Spain, Portugal, Germany, The Netherlands and United States
- Key people: Petri Nikkilä (CEO)
- Products: Banking services, loans, Mortgages and Investments
- Parent: Grupo Santander
- Website: www.openbank.es/en

Openbank is a direct bank headquartered in Madrid, Spain. Since its foundation in 1995, it has been a subsidiary of Grupo Santander. According to the Spanish Banking Association, nearly 1,350,000 accounts had been registered with the bank as of 2016. Openbank currently operates in Spain, Germany, Portugal, the Netherlands, the United States and Mexico.

== History ==
Santander created Openbank in 1995, and launched its website in 1996. In 2000, after buying the Argentine portal Patagon.com for $540 million, Openbank changed its name to Patagon Internet Bank S.A., a financial portal that combined traditional banking with digital features such as chatrooms and internet forums. In 2001, Patagon Internet Bank S.A. opened commercial offices in Zaragoza, Madrid, Pamplona, Valencia, and Barcelona. In 2005 the name was changed back to Openbank.

In 2011 Openbank released a banking app for iOS and Android. In March 2011, after its integration in the Commercial Banking Spain division, it closed 20 of its 21 remaining branches. Only the Azca branch, in Madrid, remained. In February 2013, it launched mobile applications for Android and Windows 8.

In May 2017, the company carried out a rebranding and opened a new branch on Paseo de la Castellana in Madrid, with the aim of creating an exclusive space for its clients. In June 2017, it launched a redesigned web platform and app. In 2019, Openbank began its international expansion in Germany, Portugal and the Netherlands.

== Features ==
Openbank offers a 24/7 service to all customers. Customers can deposit or withdraw cash, commission-free, at the more than 4,500 ATMs in the Santander network in Spain. They also offer an interest-bearing account with a temporary promotional rate for new accounts. With an online account, it is possible for customers to activate or deactivate cards or to defer payments from their mobile, without having to go to the bank.

The bank also has other financial products available to customers. Open Wealth is an online platform where customers can invest in real time in the various markets available on its trading tool. The bank also offers a family plan, Open Young, which has a prepaid card for use by children who can request payment from their own app. It also offers the Open Mortgage product to customers.
