= Banca Cattolica di Molfetta =

Cooperative Bank in Italy

Banca Cattolica
- Native name: Banca Cattolica S.p.A.
- Company type: subsidiary of a listed company; incorporated as a S.p.A.
- Industry: Financial services
- Predecessor: Banca Cattolica Popolare; (now "Cattolica Popolare")
- Founded: 1902 (predecessor); 1994 (spin off)
- Defunct: 2001
- Fate: absorbed by the parent company
- Successor: Cattolica Popolare (coop function only); branches of Banca Antonveneta
- Headquarters: Molfetta, Italy
- Net income: IT₤11.389 billion (2000)
- Total equity: IT₤115.113 billion (2000)
- Owner: Banca Antonveneta (86.836%)
- Parent: Banca Antonveneta

Banca Cattolica S.p.A. was an Italian cooperative bank based in Molfetta, Apulia region, southern Italy. The former parent company of the bank (until 1998), Cattolica Popolare survived as a cooperative society.

== History ==
Banca Cattolica Popolare was founded in 1902. In 1994 Banca Cattolica Popolare Società cooperativa a responsabilità limitata spin off its banking activities to form a subsidiary Banca Cattolica S.p.A., which Credito Italiano acquired 35% shares. The bank (S.p.A.) was later acquired by Banca Antoniana Popolare Veneta (Antonveneta) in 1998, for 80%. As at 31 December 2000, Antonveneta owned 86.836% of the bank's share capital; the bank had a shareholders' equity of 115.113 billion lire (about €59 million) at that time. In 2001, Banca Cattolica was absorbed into Antonveneta.

== See also ==
- List of banks in Italy
