= Banca Agricola Mantovana =

Italian bank

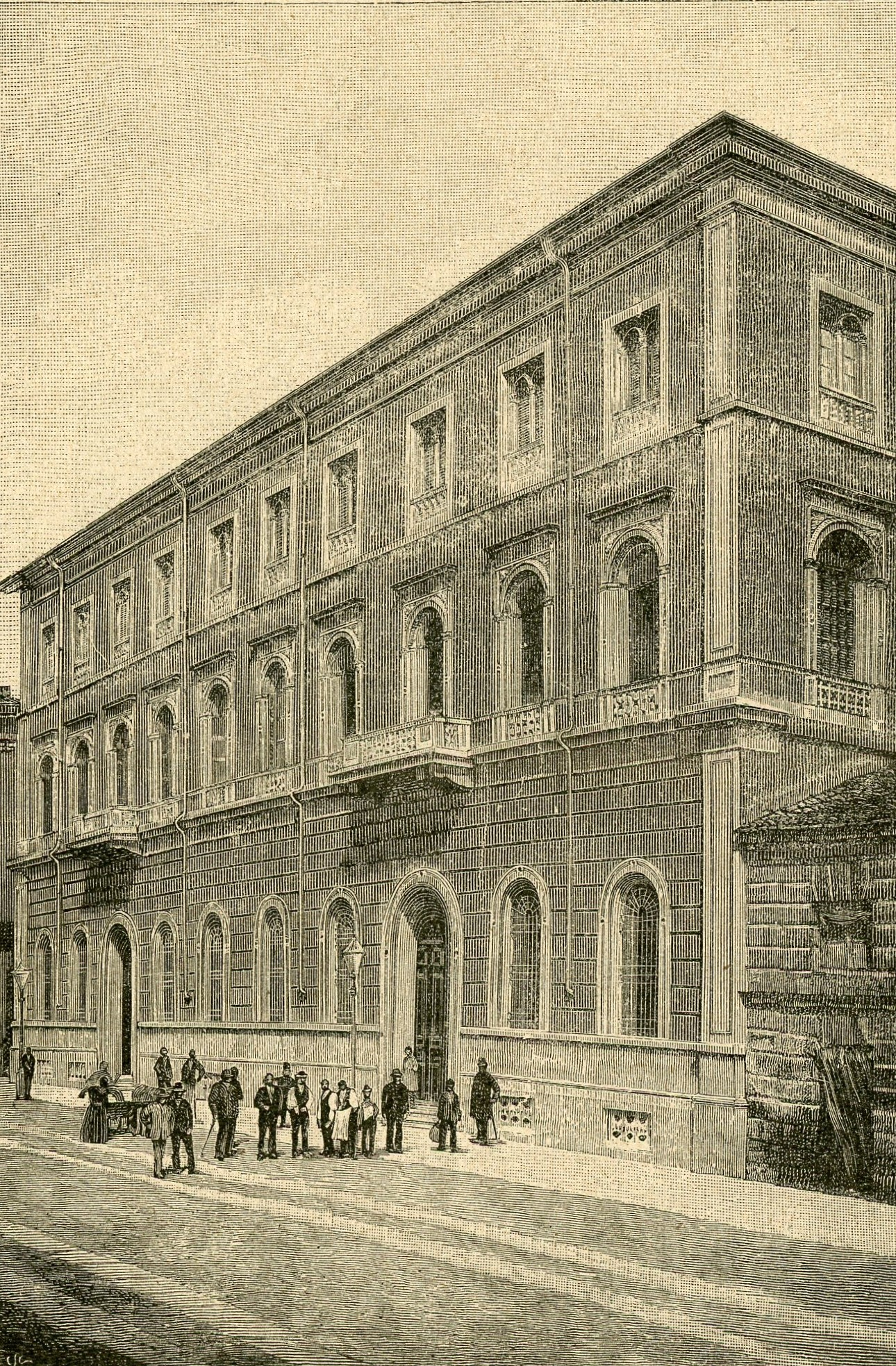
- Native name: Banca Agricola Mantovana S.p.A.
- Formerly: Banca Agricola Provinciale Mantovana
- Company type: subsidiary of a listed company
- Industry: Financial services
- Founded: 1871
- Defunct: 2008
- Fate: Absorbed by the parent company
- Headquarters: 30 Corso Vittorio Emanuele II, Mantua, Italy
- Owner: Banca MPS (100%)
- Parent: Banca MPS
- Website: Official website

Banca Agricola Mantovana S.p.A. (BAM) was an Italian bank based in Mantua, Lombardy. The bank was a subsidiary of Banca Monte dei Paschi di Siena. On 31 March 2008, the bank had a total assets of €13,502,864,975.

== History ==
Found 1871 as Banca Agricola Provinciale Mantovana, Banca Agricola Mantovana (BAM) was a cooperative bank based in Mantua. In 1932 Banca Mutua Popolare di Mantova was merged with Banca Agricola Mantovana. In 1989 the bank absorbed Banca Operaia di Bologna.

In 1998, the bank formed a joint venture agreement with Unipol in Quadrifoglio Vita, an insurance company that operated in BAM's network. BAM also acquired a minority ownership in Finsoe, the intermediate parent company of Unipol. As at 31 December 2000, BAM held 5.601% of Finsoe.

BAM was acquired by Banca Monte dei Paschi di Siena (Banca MPS) in 1999. Circa 1999–2000 the bank was changed from a cooperative society (S.C.) to a limited company (società per Azioni). In 2000 Banca MPS controlled 51.487% shares. It was increased to 52.311% in 2001 and 65.546% in 2002. In 2003 Banca MPS acquired 100% shares of BAM and Banca Toscana. Sanpaolo IMI was a minority shareholders of BAM for 8.49% as at 31 December 2001, which was sold to Banca MPS for €206 million.

On 21 September 2008 BAM was absorbed into Banca MPS. While Quadrifoglio Vita was transformed to a joint venture of AXA and Banca MPS in the same year, as well as Banca MPS sold all the shares of Finsoe, the parent company of Unipol.

== Sponsorship ==
Banca Agricola Mantovana was the sponsor of the round 7 of 1984 Italian Formula Three season.

== Foundation ==
In 2000 Banca Agricola Mantovana and Banca Monte dei Paschi di Siena established Fondazione Banca Agricola Mantovana, an independent charity organization.

== See also ==
- Banca Popolare di Mantova
- List of banks in Italy
