= MPS Finance =

Monte dei Paschi di Siena Finance, Banca Mobiliare
- Type: Subsidiary
- Industry: Financial services
- Founded: 2001
- Defunct: 2007
- Fate: Merged
- Successor: MPS Capital Services
- Headquarters: Siena, Italy, Viale G. Mazzini 23
- Products: Capital Markets, bonds
- Parent: Banca Monte dei Paschi di Siena
- Website: www.mpsfinance.it

MPS Finance (MPSF) was an Italian investment bank that was a sub-division of the Banca Monte dei Paschi di Siena. It operated between 2001 and 2007 when it was merged to form MPS Capital Services.

== History ==
MPS Finance was founded in 2001 was set up to be one of the "center of excellence" of Monte dei Paschi di Siena Group. Operating on two macro-platforms, MPS Finance performed the typical investment banking activity (Capital Market, Derivatives, Corporate and Government Bonds) and, at the same time, it was a financial product factory which created and places a whole range of financial products and services for both corporate and retail customers.

In 2007 MPS Finance and MPS Banca per l'Impresa SpA were integrated in a new company for project- and corporate-financing and special lending, MPS Capital Services Banca per l'Impresa SpA (MPS CS), the Corporate and Investment Bank of Montepaschi Group.
