= Banco Santander =

Spanish multinational bank

Banco Santander S.A.

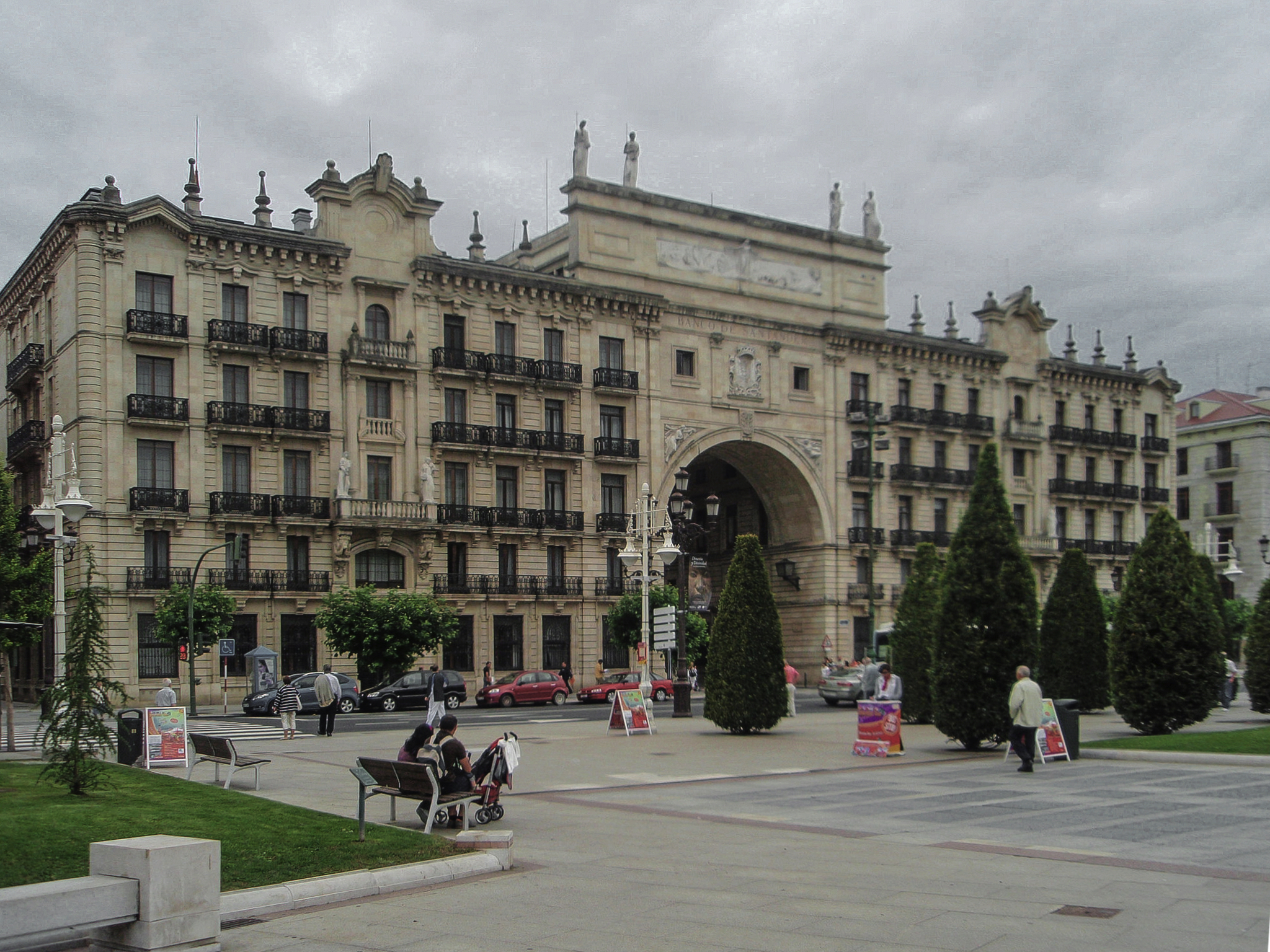
- The façade of Banco Santander headquarters in Santander, Spain
- Trade name: Santander Group
- Type: Public
- Traded as: BMAD: SAN; NYSE: SAN; WSE: SAN; LSE: BNC; IBEX 35 component
- ISIN: ES0113900J37
- Industry: Financial services
- Founded: 15 May 1857; 169 years ago
- Headquarters: Santander, Spain (legal); Boadilla del Monte, Spain (operational)
- Area served: Worldwide
- Key people: Ana Patricia Botín (Group Executive chairman); José Antonio Álvarez (Vice chairman); Héctor Grisi Checa (CEO)
- Products: Retail banking; corporate banking; investment banking; insurance; private banking; private equity; mortgage loans; credit cards; investment management; wealth management; asset management; mutual funds; exchange-traded funds; index funds
- Revenue: ▲€61.88 billion (2024)
- Operating income: ▲€19.03 billion (2024)
- Net income: ▲€12.57 billion (2024)
- AUM: ▲€498.3 billion (2024)
- Total assets: ▲€1.954 trillion (Q2 2026)
- Total equity: ▲€107.3 billion (2024)
- Number of employees: ▼206,753 (2024)
- Website: santander.com

Banco Santander S.A., trading as Santander Group (UK: /ˌsæntənˈdɛər, -tæn-/ SAN-tən-DAIR, -tan-, US: /ˌsɑːntɑːnˈdɛər/ SAHN-tahn-DAIR, Spanish: [ˈbaŋko santanˈdeɾ]), is a Spanish multinational financial services company based in Santander. It is Europe's 4th largest bank by assets, with $2.251 trillion in assets and the 16th-largest banking institution in the world. Although known for its European banking operations, it has extended operations across North America and South America, and more recently in continental Asia, and it maintains a presence in most global financial centres.

It is considered a systemically important bank by the Financial Stability Board, a Significant Institution since the entry into force of European Banking Supervision in late 2014, and as a consequence is directly supervised by the European Central Bank. It is a component of the Euro Stoxx 50 stock market index, was ranked 49th in the Forbes Global 2000 (2023) list of the world's biggest public companies.

Many subsidiaries, such as Abbey National, have been rebranded under the Santander name.

Banco Santander is chaired by Ana Botín, daughter and granddaughter of former chairmen Emilio Botin-Sanz de Sautuola y García de los Ríos and Emilio Botín-Sanz de Sautuola López, respectively.

== History ==
Banco Santander was founded in 1857 as Banco de Santander. Santander expanded in Latin America during the mid-1990s and early 2000s through acquisitions across the region. These operations became an important source of earnings for the Group during the following decades and particularly in the aftermath of the 2007-2008 financial crisis. Historical research has emphasised that the success of Santander's expansion in Latin America depended not only on acquisitions but also on the integration of management practices and the way it deployed information technology across the region.

In 1999, it merged with Banco Central Hispano, or BCH, which had in turn been formed through the 1991 merger of Banco Central and Banco Hispanoamericano. The combined bank, known as Banco Santander Central Hispano, or BSCH, was designed to be a "merger of equals", in which the top executives of the two pre-existing firms would share control of the merged entity.

Soon after the merger former BCH executives accused Banco Santander chairman Emilio Botín Sanz de Sautuola y García de los Ríos of trying to push his own agenda and threatened to take legal action. This post-merger disagreement was resolved when BCH executives Jose Amusátegui and Angel Corcóstegui agreed to accept severance payments, retire and pass control to Botín, at an expense to shareholders of €183 million. The large termination payouts generated negative press, and Botín was eventually brought to trial on criminal charges of "misappropriation of funds" and "irresponsible management". However, in April 2005, the court cleared him of all charges, the €164 million retirement payments made to the two former executives having been found to be legal, "made as compensation for the services provided to the bank". Also that year, the anti-corruption division of the Spanish public prosecutor's office cleared Botín of all charges in a separate case, in which he was accused of insider trading.

In 2007, the bank officially changed the official name back to Banco Santander S.A. In 1996, Banco Santander acquired Grupo Financiero InverMexico. In 2000, Banco Santander Central Hispano acquired Grupo Financiero Serfin of Mexico.

On 26 July 2004, Banco Santander Central Hispano announced the acquisition of Abbey National plc. Following shareholders' approval at the EGM of Abbey (95 percent voted in favour, despite vocal opposition from most of those present) and Santander, the acquisition was formally approved by the courts and Abbey became part of the Santander Group on 12 November 2004.

In June 2006, Banco Santander purchased almost 20% of Sovereign Bank and acquired the option to buy the bank (at the time, the market value was roughly US$40 per share) for one year beginning in the middle of 2008.

In May 2007, Banco Santander Central Hispano announced that in conjunction with The Royal Bank of Scotland and Fortis it would make an offer for ABN AMRO. BSCH's share of the offer added up to 28% and the offer would have to be made up of a capital increase through a new share issue. Then in October 2007, the consortium outbid Barclays and acquired ABN AMRO. As part of the deal, Grupo Santander acquired ABN AMRO's subsidiary in Brazil, Banco Real, and its subsidiary in Italy, Banca Antonveneta.

On 13 August 2007, Banco Santander Central Hispano changed its legal name to Banco Santander. In November that year, it sold Banca Antonveneta to Banca Monte dei Paschi di Siena, excluding a subsidiary Interbanca. In March 2008, Banco Santander sold Interbanca to GE Commercial Finance, receiving in return GE Money businesses in Germany, Finland and Austria, and GE's card and auto-financing businesses in the UK, which it integrated with Santander Consumer Finance.

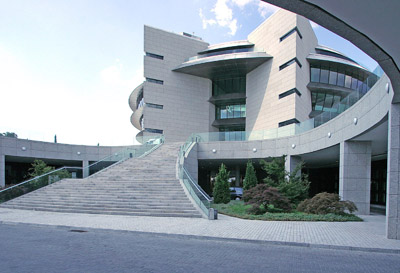
"Ciudad Financiera de Boadilla", headquarters in Boadilla del Monte, Spain

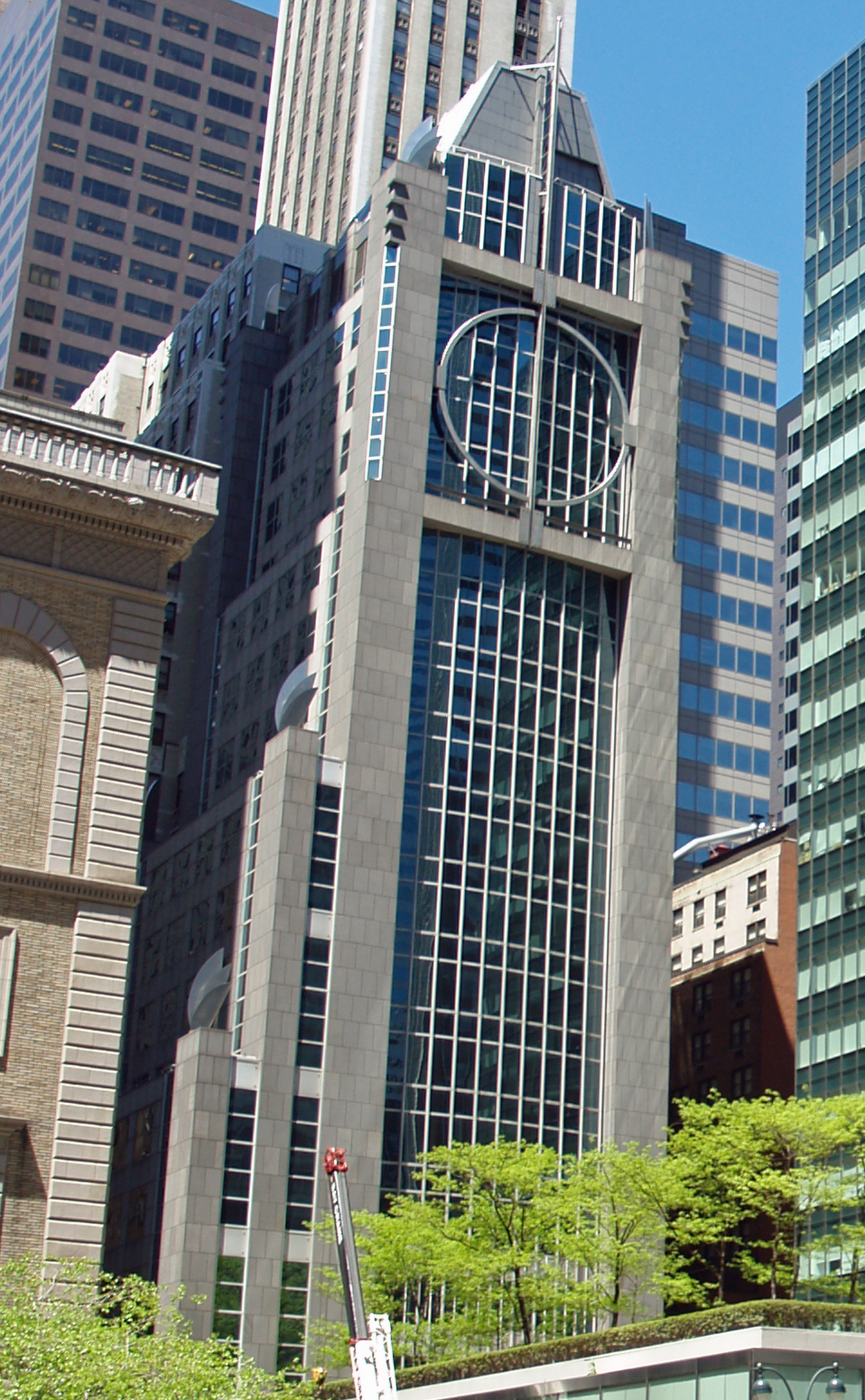
"Banco Santander Building" at 53rd Street, New York, formerly the bank's US headquarters

In July 2008, the group announced it intended to purchase the UK bank Alliance & Leicester, which held £24 billion in deposits and had 254 branches. Santander also purchased the savings business of Bradford & Bingley in September 2008, which held deposits of £22 billion, 2.6 million customers, 197 branches and 140 agencies. The acquisition of Alliance & Leicester completed in October 2008 when the B&B's shares were delisted from the London Stock Exchange. By the end of 2010 the two banks merged with Abbey National under the Santander UK brand.

In October 2008, the Group announced to acquire 75.65% of Sovereign Bancorp it did not own for approximately US$1.9 billion (€1.4 billion). Because of the 2008 financial crisis at the time, Sovereign's share price had fallen greatly: rather than the $40 per share it would have cost in 2006, Banco Santander ended up paying less than $3 per share. The acquisition of Sovereign gave Santander its first retail bank in the mainland United States. Santander renamed the bank to enhance its global brand recognition in October 2013.

On 14 December 2008, it was revealed that the collapse of Bernard Madoff's Ponzi scheme might mean the loss of €2.33 billion at Banco Santander.

On 10 November 2009, HSBC Finance Corporation announced its auto finance entities had reached an agreement with Santander Consumer USA Inc.(SC USA) to sell HSBC US auto loan servicing operations, US$1 billion in auto loan receivables for US$904 million in cash, and enter into a loan servicing agreement for the remainder of its liquidated US auto loan portfolio. The transaction closed in the first quarter of 2010.

In September 2010, Santander purchased Bank Zachodni WBK from Allied Irish Banks. On 28 February 2012, Santander announced that it had reached an agreement with KBC Bank to buy KBC's subsidiary Kredyt Bank in Poland. Santander merged Bank Zachodni WBK and Kredyt to create Poland's third-biggest bank, valued at about €5 billion (US$6.7 billion), having a market share of 9.6% in deposits, 8.0% in loans, 12.9% in branches (899), and more than 3.5 million retail customers. As a result of the merger, Santander came to hold 76.5% of the combined bank, and KBC came to hold about 16.4%; other shareholders held about 7.1% of the shares in the combined bank. Santander stated that it intended to buy more of KBC's shares in the combined bank to bring KBC's holdings below 10%; KBC affirmed it intended to sell its remaining stake. KBC sold its shareholding and Santander owns 75% of the bank, the rest is free float.

In December 2012, Banco Santander announced that it would absorb Banesto and Banco BANIF, purchasing the remaining 10% of Banesto it did not already own.

In October 2013, Santander acquired 51% of Spain's largest consumer finance business, Financiera El Corte Inglés, for around €140 million. Santander acquired a €470 million stake in HSBC's Bank of Shanghai in 2013 to rebalance its business to the Asian market.

In June 2014, Santander bought GE Money Bank, GE Capital's consumer finance business in Sweden, Norway and Denmark, for €700 million (US$950 million). In September 2014, it was announced that Santander was in talks to merge its asset management unit with that of Unicredit to create a European firm worth €350 billion in assets.

In November 2014, Banco Santander acquired a 5.1 percent stake in Monitise plc for £33 million. On 7 June 2017, Banco Santander purchased Banco Popular Español for a symbolic price of €1.

In 2018, the bank announced a three-year push into Latin America to increase its presence in the market, particularly Brazil and Mexico, targeting the countries' super-rich.

On 13 and 14 July 2019, the integration of the entire Banco Popular network was completed. This meant the definitive end of the Popular brand from a commercial point of view.

Dodge & Cox became Santander's second shareholder in an operation carried out on 13 June 2022. The US fund has a 3.038% stake in the bank. At the time of purchase, given the value of 2.64 euros per share, this stake was valued at 1,364 million euros.

In February 2024, Banco Santander launched a share buyback of about 1.5 billion euros ($1.6 billion) and raised its payout ratio to 50%.

On 21 October 2024, Santander launched its digital bank in the United States, with the potential to fund up to $30 billion in vehicle loans.

On 3 February 2026, Santander announced that it would acquire US lender Webster Bank in a cash and stock deal valued at $12.2 billion. The acquisition would position Santander as one of the top ten banks in the U.S., with approximately $327 billion in combined assets between Webster and Santander Bank, its US subsidiary. In August 2026, the Federal Reserve gave its approval to the acquisition of Webster, and Santander subsequently completed the acquisition.

== Financial data ==
Financial data (in € billions)
Year	2013	2014	2015	2016	2017	2018	2019	2020	2021	2022	2023	2024
Revenue	39.753	42.612	45.272	43.853	48.392	48.424	49.229	44.279	46.404	52.117	57.423	61.876
Net Income	5.409	7.024	7.819	7.892	8.963	9.315	8.116	(7.708)	8.124	9.605	11.076	12.574
Assets	1,115	1,266	1,340	1,339	1,444	1,459	1,522	1,508	1,595	1,734	1,797	1,837
Employees	182,958	185,405	193,863	188,492	202,251	202,713	196,419	191,189	199,177	206,462	212,764	206,753

== Operations ==
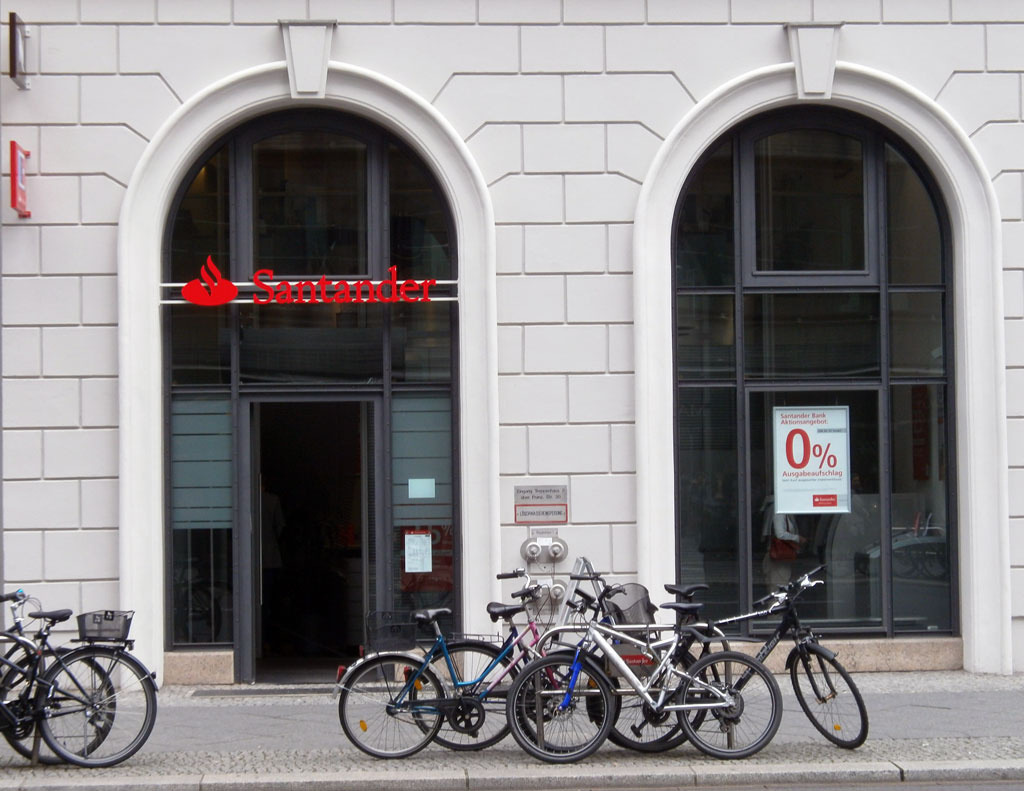
A branch of Santander in Berlin, Germany

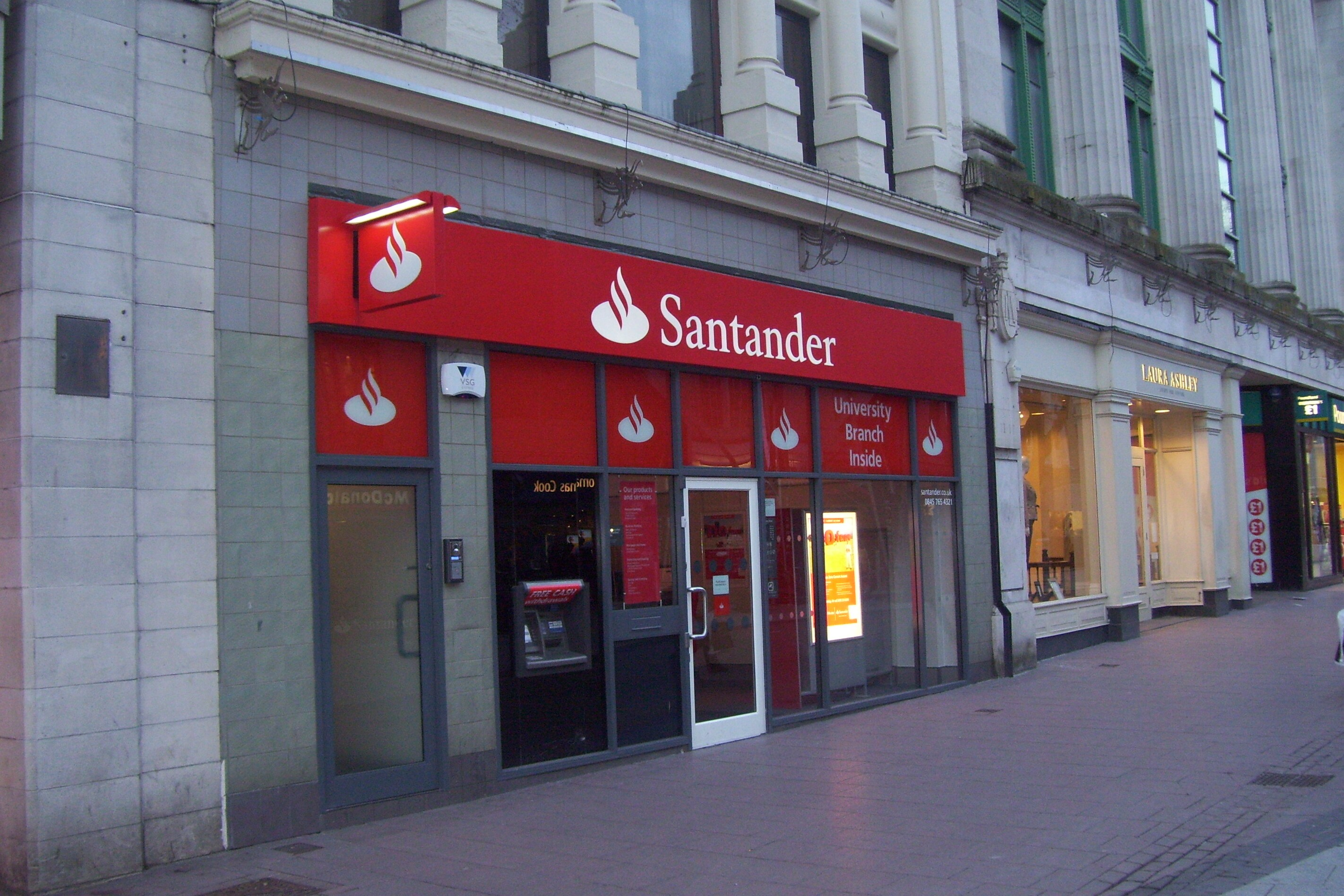
A branch of Santander in Cardiff, Wales

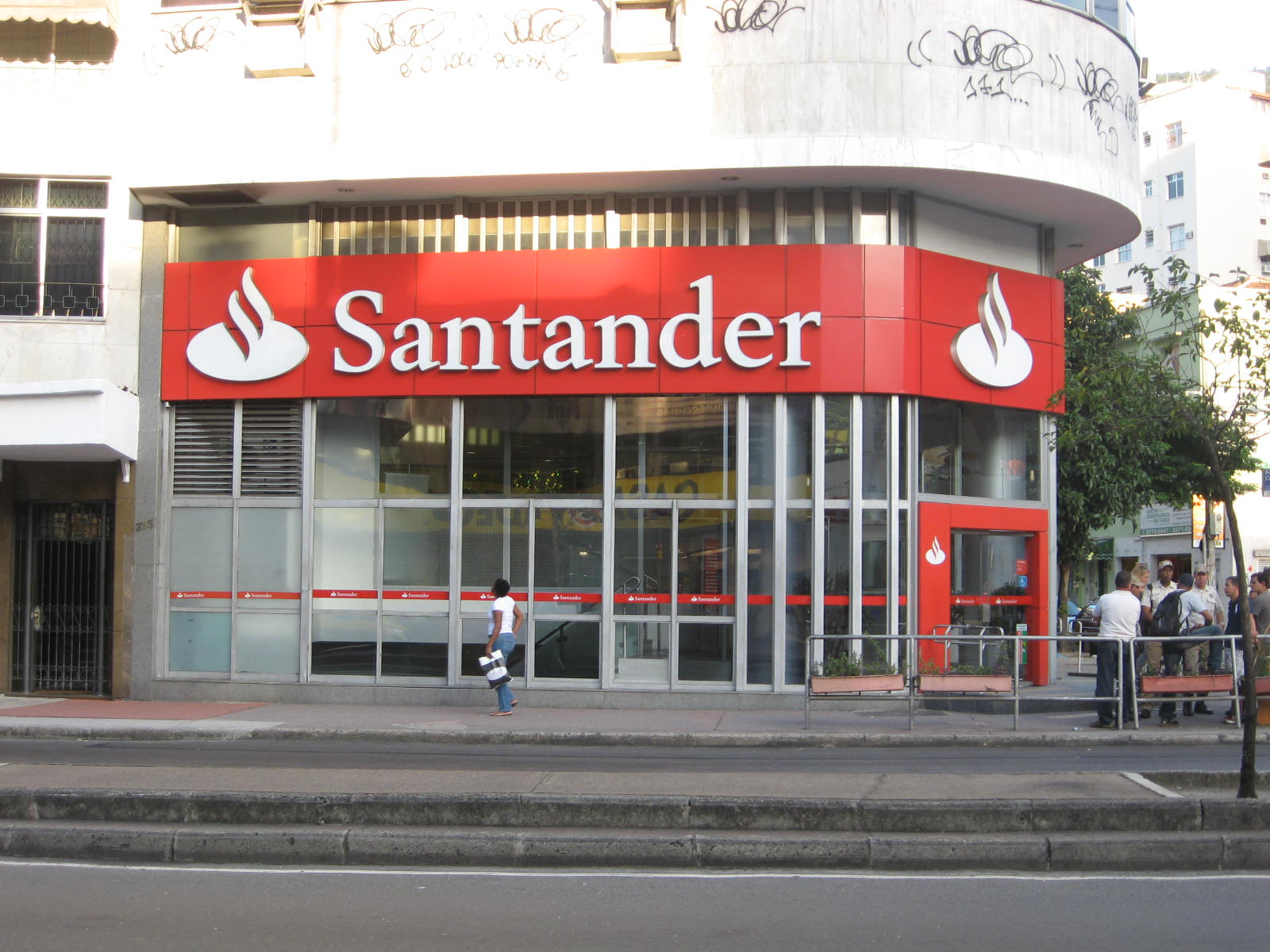
A branch of Santander in Rio de Janeiro, Brazil

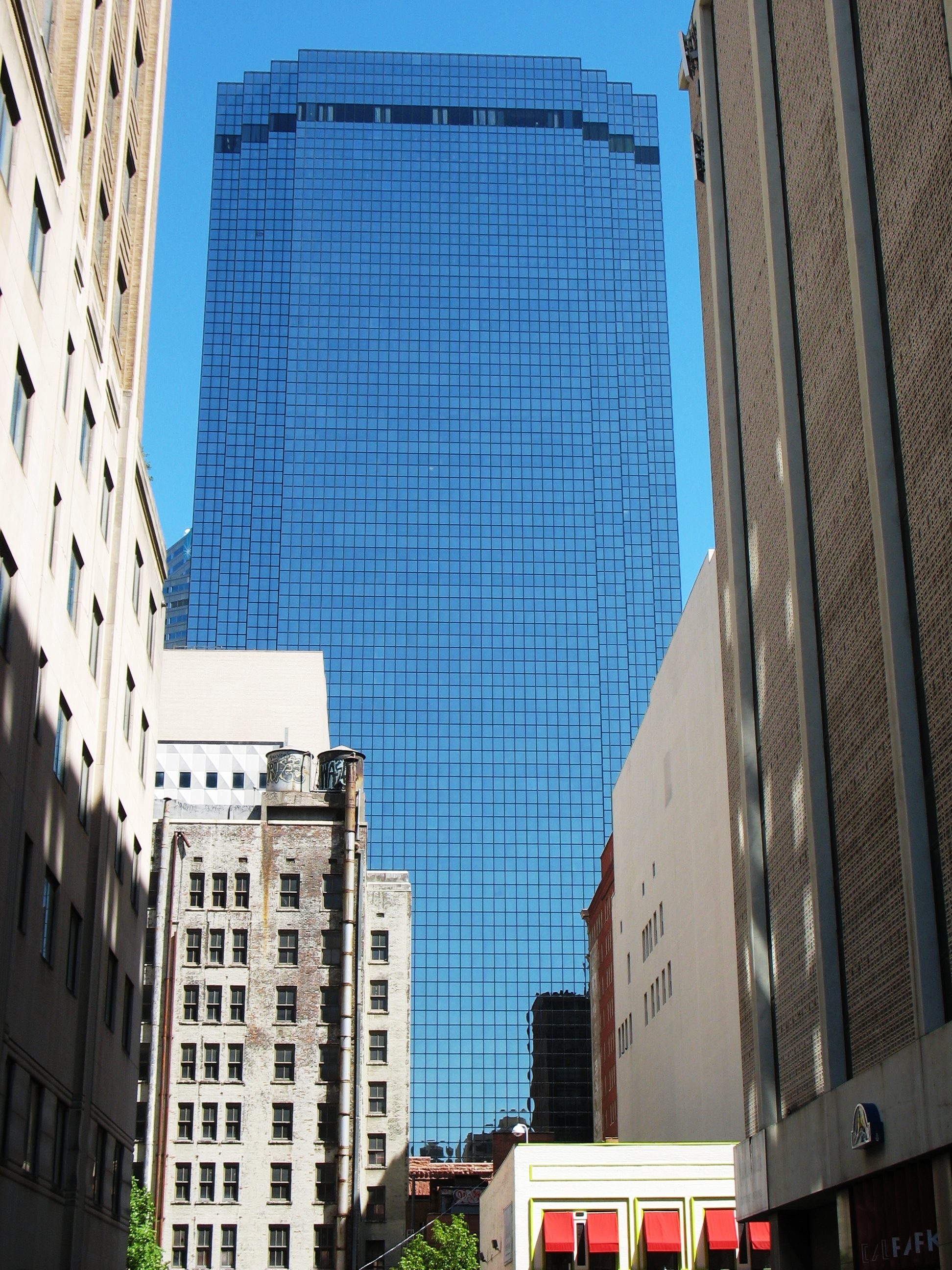
Santander Tower in Dallas, Texas

The Santander Group operates across Europe, South America, North America and Asia, partly due to its acquisitions. As of 2013 it had more than 186,000 employees, 14,392 branches, 3.26 million shareholders and 102 million customers. Retail banking — the main aspect of Santander's operations – generates 74% of the group's profit. The top markets by revenue in 2023 were: Brazil (21.6%), Spain (17.4%), the US (12.3%), the UK (11.2%), Mexico (10.2%), Poland (6.3%), Chile (3.9%) and Portugal (3.6%).

On 10 June 2010, Grupo Santander announced that it would invest approximately US$270 million (€200 million) in Campinas, Brazil in a technology centre for research and data processing and a data centre that was to support operations across North America, Central America and South America. The new centre was to be established within the 'Development Company for High Technology Cluster of Campinas' on 1 million square metres. Construction began in January 2011, and full operation was expected in 2013 offering over 8,000 direct and indirect jobs.

In 2013, global growth equity firm General Atlantic, along with Warburg Pincus LLC, acquired a 50% stake in Santander Asset Management.

In 2010, Banco Santander expanded into China, focusing on trade finance services and establishing a joint venture with China Construction Bank. The venture was set up in 2011 with initial funds of 3.5 billion yuan (US$530 million).

=== Europe ===
- Austria
  - Santander Consumer Bank GmbH
- Belgium
  - Santander Consumer Finance Benelux B.V.
- Denmark
  - Santander Consumer Bank AS
- Finland
  - Santander Consumer Finance Oy
- France
  - Banco Santander, S.A. – Representative Office in Paris
- Germany
  - Santander Consumer Bank AG
  - Santander Bank (Zweigniederlassung der Santander Consumer Bank AG)
  - Santander Consumer Debit GmbH
  - Santander Consumer Leasing GmbH
- Italy
  - Santander Consumer Bank S.p.A.
  - Santander Private Banking
- Luxembourg
  - Banco Santander Totta S.A
- Netherlands
  - Santander Consumer Finance Benelux B.V.
- Norway
  - Santander Consumer Bank AS
- Poland
  - Santander Bank Polska
  - Santander Consumer Bank S.A.
- Portugal
  - Banco Santander Portugal
  - Banco Popular Portugal
  - Banco Santander Consumer Portugal, SA
  - WiZink Portugal
  - Hispamer
- Spain
  - Banco Santander
  - Banco Popular Español
  - Banco Pastor
  - Santander Consumer Finance
  - Openbank
- Sweden
  - Santander Consumer Bank AS
- Switzerland
  - Santander Private Banking
- United Kingdom
  - Santander UK
  - Cahoot
  - Cater Allen
  - Santander International
    - Isle of Man branch
    - Jersey branch
  - Santander Consumer (UK) plc
  - Santander Totta
  - TSB Bank

=== Americas ===
- Argentina
  - Banco Santander Argentina
- Brazil
  - Banco Santander Brasil
- Canada
  - Santander Consumer Bank - Formerly CARFINCO - Based in Edmonton, Alberta, Canada
- Chile
  - Banco Santander-Chile
  - Banco Santander Banefe
- Colombia
  - Banco Santander de Negocios Colombia S.A.
- Mexico
  - Santander México
- Peru
  - Banco Santander Perú S.A.
- United States
  - Banco Santander Puerto Rico
  - Santander Private Banking
  - Santander Bank
  - Santander Consumer USA
  - Santander Global Banking & Markets
  - Santander Overseas Bank
  - RoadLoans
  - HelpingLoans
  - TotalBank (Miami Dade)
- Uruguay
  - Banco Santander Uruguay

=== Asia and Australia ===
- China
  - Banco Santander, S.A. – Shanghai branch
  - Banco Santander, S.A. – Beijing branch
- Hong Kong
  - Banco Santander, S.A. – Hong Kong branch
- Singapore
  - Banco Santander, S.A. – Singapore branch
  - BDO Unibank, - Philippines Branch

=== Africa ===
- Attijariwafa Bank (4.55% share)

== Sponsorships ==
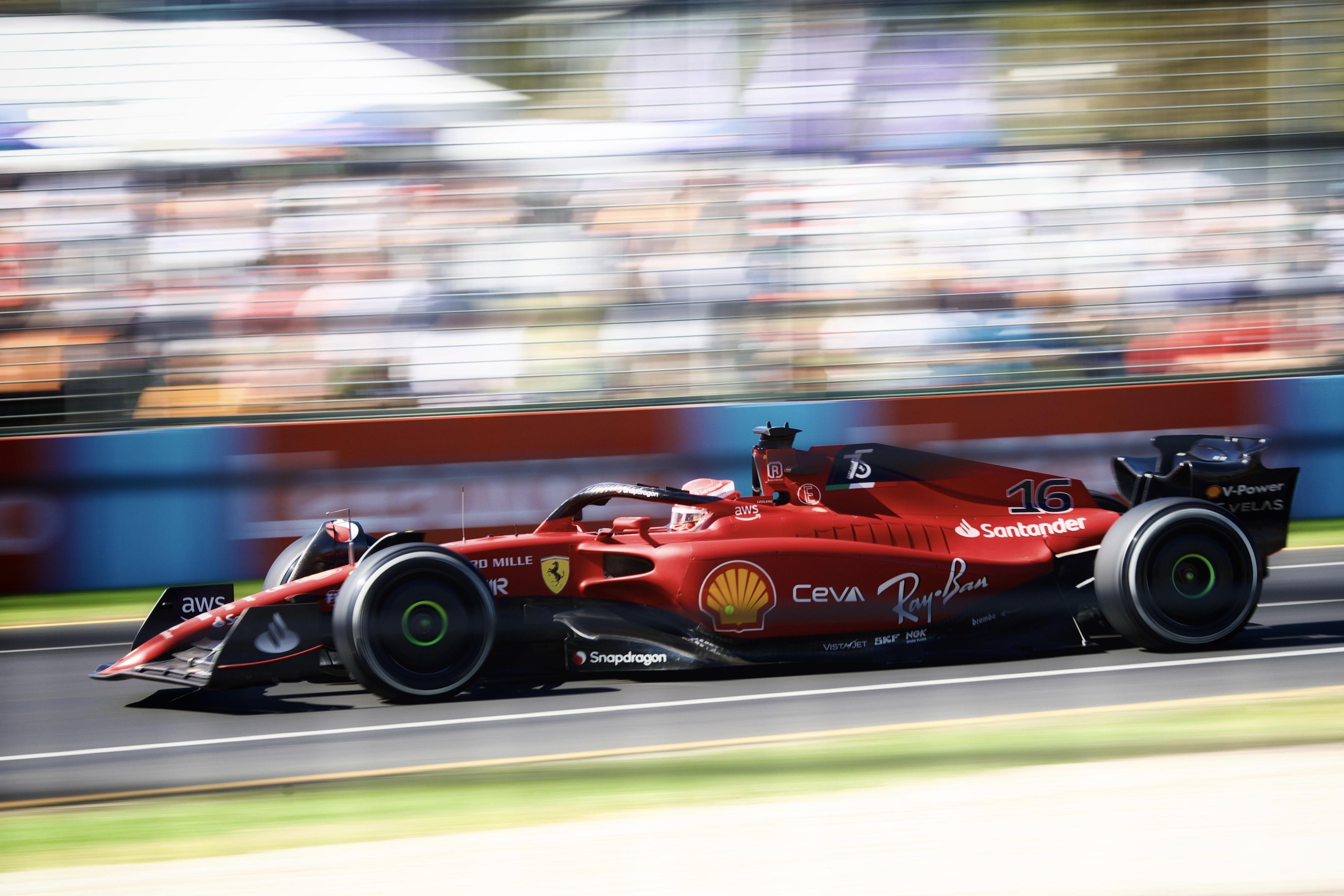
The Ferrari F1-75, a Santander-sponsored F1 car

Santander and La Liga had a title sponsorship deal from the 2016–17 season, forming the Spanish football league known commercially as La Liga Santander. Santander sponsored the UEFA Champions League for two years, from the 2018–19 season to 2020–21.

Santander has also sponsored the main South American club competition Copa Libertadores since 2008 for the South American markets.

In Formula One, from 2007 to 2017, Santander was a corporate sponsor of the Ferrari and McLaren teams. From 2022, Santander returned to Formula One as a premium sponsor of Ferrari. In 2024, it was announced that Santander's sponsorship deal with Ferrari would end after the 2025 season. Following this, Santander confirmed it would become an official partner of Williams Racing starting in 2025.

In March 2020, Santander Group in conjunction with La Liga announced the first ever LaligaSantander Fest, a global charity concert event seeking to raise funds in response to the COVID-19 pandemic.

== See also ==
- Inter-Alpha Group of Banks
- List of banks in the euro area
- List of banks in Spain
