= Massively parallel (disambiguation) =

Massively parallel in computing is the use of a large number of processors to perform a set of computations in parallel (simultaneously).

Massively parallel may also refer to:

- Massive parallel sequencing, or massively parallel sequencing, DNA sequencing using the concept of massively parallel processing
- Massively parallel signature sequencing, a procedure used to identify and quantify mRNA transcripts

== See also ==
- MPQC (Massively Parallel Quantum Chemistry), a computational chemistry software program
