= Banca Antonveneta =

Bank based in Padua, Italy

Banca Antonveneta S.p.A.
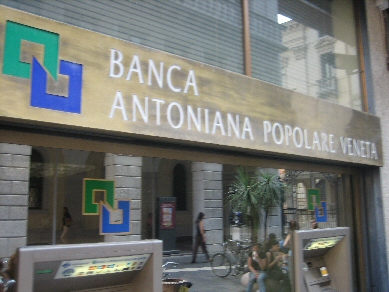
- Banca Antonveneta's branch in Padua, Italy
- Formerly: Banca Antoniana Popolare Veneta S.c. a r.l.; Banca Antoniana Popolare Veneta S.p.A.
Company type
Subsidiary	(2006–2013)
Listed	(2002–2006)
Cooperative	(1996–2002)
- Industry: Financial services
- Predecessor: Banca Antoniana; Banca Popolare Veneta
Founded
1996	(date of merger)
2008	(new legal entity)
- Defunct: 2013
- Fate: absorbed by the parent company
- Headquarters: Padua, Italy
- Services: retail banking; corporate banking
- Owners: Banca Monte dei Paschi di Siena (100%)
- Parent: Banca Monte dei Paschi di Siena

Banca Antonveneta S.p.A. was an Italian bank based in Padua, Italy. The bank was absorbed into Banca Monte dei Paschi di Siena in 2013.

In 2008, it was the 9th largest banking group in Italy in terms of customer loans and the 8th largest in terms of total assets, with 1,000 branches, 10,800 employees and €50bn in assets.

The bank only operates in the fragmented Italian market, where it has a market share of roughly 3%, as the 6th largest bank at that time. More precisely, the bank had 8% market share in Veneto, 7% in Friuli, 6% in Sicily and 3% in both Lazio and Emilia Romagna. It has a focus on the wealthy Northeast of the country with 6% market share and 600 branches.

Eighty-six percent of its clients are retail clients, accounting for 58% of assets, most of which are owned by affluent and private clients, 12% corporate, accounting for 42% of assets, and 2% institutional.

== History ==
Banca Antoniana Popolare Veneta was created by the merger in 1996 of two banks, Banca Antoniana and Banca Popolare Veneta, a cooperative bank.

=== Predecessors ===
Banca Antoniana traced its origins back to its founding in Padua in 1893 under the name Banca Cattolica Padovana.

Banca Popolare Veneta was also founded in Padua, in this case in 1866 under the name Banca Mutua di Credito Popolare; in 1883 it transformed itself into Banca Cooperativa Popolare. After World War II, it acquired several other cooperative banks (Italian: Banca Popolare) located in Treviso in 1950, Polesine in 1980, Cavarzere in 1982, and Valdagno in 1987. In that same year the bank took the name, Banca Popolare Veneta.

=== Banca Antoniana Popolare Veneta ===
In 1997, i.e., one year after the merger, the bank acquired a majority interest in Interbanca, which gave Banca Antonveneta the capability to function as a universal bank, not just a retail bank. Then in 1999 it acquired Banca Nazionale dell'Agricoltura, which gave it a presence throughout Italy, especially in the south. In 2001 the bank absorbed Banca Cattolica of Molfetta as well as acquired Banca Popolare Jonica of Grottaglie.

Since then it has focused more on internally financed growth and in 2002 it switched from being a cooperative society with limited liabilities (S.c. a r.l.) to a publicly traded Società per azioni (S.p.A.), in the Borsa Italiana (Italian stock exchange) as Banca Antoniana Popolare Veneta S.p.A. and as trading name Banca Antonveneta S.p.A. (later also became legal name). Circa 2004 the bank absorbed Banca di Credito Popolare di Siracusa and Banca Agricola Etnea. In the same year Banca Antonveneta sold 30 branches to Banca Nuova and 20 branches to Unipol Banca.

==== As a subsidiary of ABN AMRO ====
In 2005, Dutch financial powerhouse ABN AMRO successfully overcame a scandal-ridden campaign by Italian banking regulators to become the first foreign bank to own an Italian bank. This move has been said to clear the way for other European banks to enter the lucrative Italian market. In early 2006, Antonveneta's shares were delisted from the Italian stock exchange as ABN AMRO acquired more than a 96.7% stake in the banking group by acquiring the shares from other shareholders. Banca Popolare di Lodi (also known as Banca Popolare Italiana), which lost the takeover battle to ABN AMRO, signed a contract to sell the shares of Antonveneta to ABN AMRO in September 2005.

In October 2007, a consortium comprising Royal Bank of Scotland, Banco Santander and Fortis acquired ABN AMRO in order to divide its assets between them. In the division of the spoils, Santander received Banca Antonveneta.

==== As a subsidiary of MPS ====
Then on 8 November 2007 Santander announced that it had received and accepted an offer of €9 billion for Antonveneta from Banca Monte dei Paschi di Siena (BMPS). However, Interbanca was excluded from the sale, which was sold to GE Financial instead in March 2008. The sale of Antonveneta was completed on 30 May 2008. According to news reports at that time, the price, in terms of price per branch, was in line with the historic price of similar deals at that time, such as the sale of branches from Banca Intesa to Crédit Agricole. However, after BMPS was bailed out by the government a few years later, the takeover deal was described as "draining [BMPS'] cash reserves just as markets were peaking". The deal, which should have raised alarms among regulators, was approved by the Bank of Italy…" by a Bloomberg Opinion columnist, Elisa Martinuzzi.

As at 31 December 2007 Antonveneta Group (including Interbanca) had a shareholders' equity of €3.373 billion. After Antonveneta was acquired, an internal reconstruction within MPS Group was made, which New Antonveneta (Italian: Nuova Antonveneta), a new company incorporated in April 2008, would receive the assets and liabilities of old Antonveneta on 1 January 2009. The shareholders' equity of Antonveneta had changed from €3.308 billion in December 2009. to €3.579 billion in December 2010 and then fell to €2.134 billion in 2011. As of 31 December 2012 the shareholders' equity was €2.001 billion.

In April 2013 Monte dei Paschi finally absorbed Antonventa. It became "Area Territoriale Antonveneta" of the bank.

== Sponsorship ==
Banca Antonveneta was the sponsor of Pallavolo Padova.

== See also ==
- List of banks in Italy
