= Banca Monte dei Paschi di Siena =

Italian bank

Coordinates: 43°19′17″N 11°19′51″E

Banca Monte dei Paschi di Siena S.p.A.

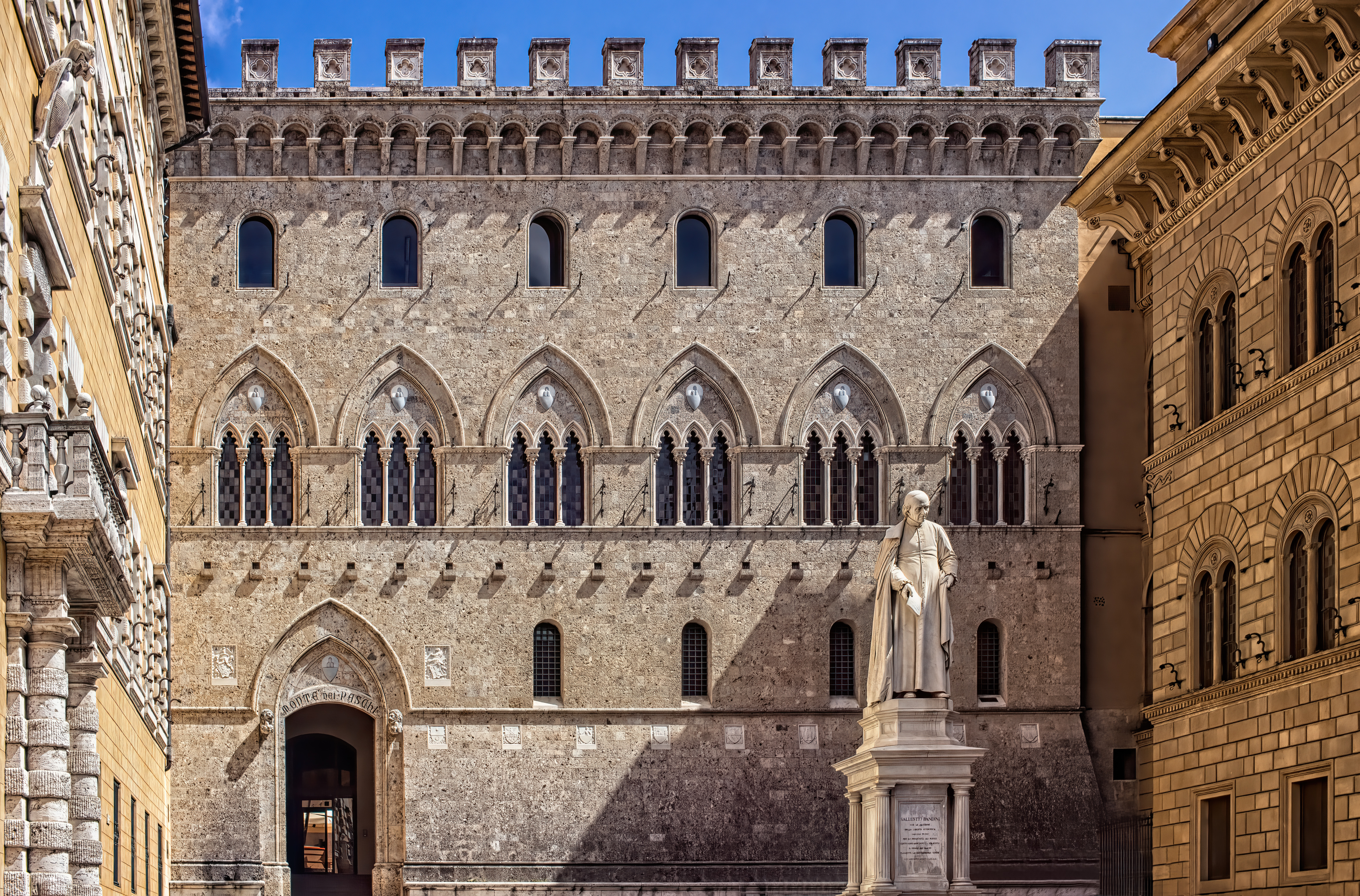
- Monte dei Paschi di Siena Headquarter's Main Entrance, Palazzo Salimbeni, Siena
- Type: Public (Società per azioni)
- Traded as: BIT: BMPS
- ISIN: IT0005218752
- Industry: Financial services
- Founded: 4 March 1472; 554 years ago (as a mount of piety)
- Headquarters: Siena, Italy
- Number of locations: ▼1,368 domestic branches; 11 branches abroad (2021)
- Key people: Nicola Maione (chairman); Luigi Lovaglio (CEO)
- Services: Retail banking; corporate banking; investment banking; insurance; investment management
- Revenue: ▲€2.980 billion (2021)
- Operating income: ▲€629.2 million (2021)
- Net income: ▲€310 million (2021)
- Total assets: €245,898 billion (Q2 2026)
- Total equity: ▲€6.172 billion (2021)
- Owner: Delfin (Del Vecchio family) (17.5%)
- Number of employees: ▼21,244 (2021)
- Subsidiaries: Mediobanca (86.35%) (1 October 2025); MPS Capital Services; Monte Paschi Banque
- Capital ratio: ▲12.5% (CET1, 2021)
- Website: www.gruppomps.it

Banca Monte dei Paschi di Siena S.p.A. (Italian pronunciation: [ˈbaŋka ˈmonte dei ˈpaski di ˈsjɛːna]), known as BMPS or just MPS, is an Italian bank. Tracing its history to a mount of piety founded in 1472 (554 years ago) and established in its present form in 1624 (402 years ago), it is the world's oldest bank, and after the acquisition of Mediobanca in 2025 it is the third largest Italian bank.

In 1995, the bank (then known as Monte dei Paschi di Siena) was transformed from a statutory corporation to a limited company called Banca Monte dei Paschi di Siena (Banca MPS). The Fondazione Monte dei Paschi di Siena was created to continue the charitable functions of the bank and to be, until the bailout in 2013, its largest single shareholder. In 2016–17, BMPS was struggling to avoid a collapse, and it was bailed out again by the Italian government in July 2017.

In 2020, BMPS had approximately 1,400 branches, 21,000 employees and 3.9 million customers in Italy, as well as branches and businesses abroad. A subsidiary, MPS Capital Services, handles corporate and investment banking. It has been designated as a Significant Institution since the entry into force of European Banking Supervision in late 2014, and as a consequence is directly supervised by the European Central Bank.

== History ==
Banca Monte dei Paschi di Siena traces its history to a mount of piety (monte di pietà) founded by order of the Magistrature of the Republic of Siena on 4 March 1472, when its statute was approved. It is therefore often regarded as being the oldest bank in the world in continuous operation. The basis of its foundation is the Statuto dei Paschi, written in 1419, a law that regulated all activities related to agriculture and pastoralism in Maremma.

Its current form dates from 1624, when Siena was incorporated into the Grand Duchy of Tuscany and Grand Duke Ferdinando II granted to depositors of Monte, in their warranty, the income of the state-owned pastures of Maremma (the so-called "Paschi" which gave the bank its name). The bank consolidated and increased its banking activity during the 17th and 18th centuries.

With the unification of Italy, the bank expanded its business throughout the Italian Peninsula, initiating new activities, including mortgage loans, the first experience in Italy. It was still state-owned by the late 19th century.

In 1988, MPS was involved in the bail-out of Cassa di Risparmio di Prato, becoming the major shareholder.

In 1995, a decree of the Ministry of the Treasury of the Italian Republic dated 8 August 1995, gave rise to two institutions: Banca Monte dei Paschi di Siena S.p.A. and Fondazione Monte dei Paschi di Siena, a non-profit organization with the statutory purpose of providing assistance, charity and social utility in the fields of education, science, health and art, especially with reference to the city and the province of Siena.

On 25 June 1999, Banca Monte dei Paschi di Siena was listed successfully on the Borsa Italiana.

=== Expansion (2000–2006) ===
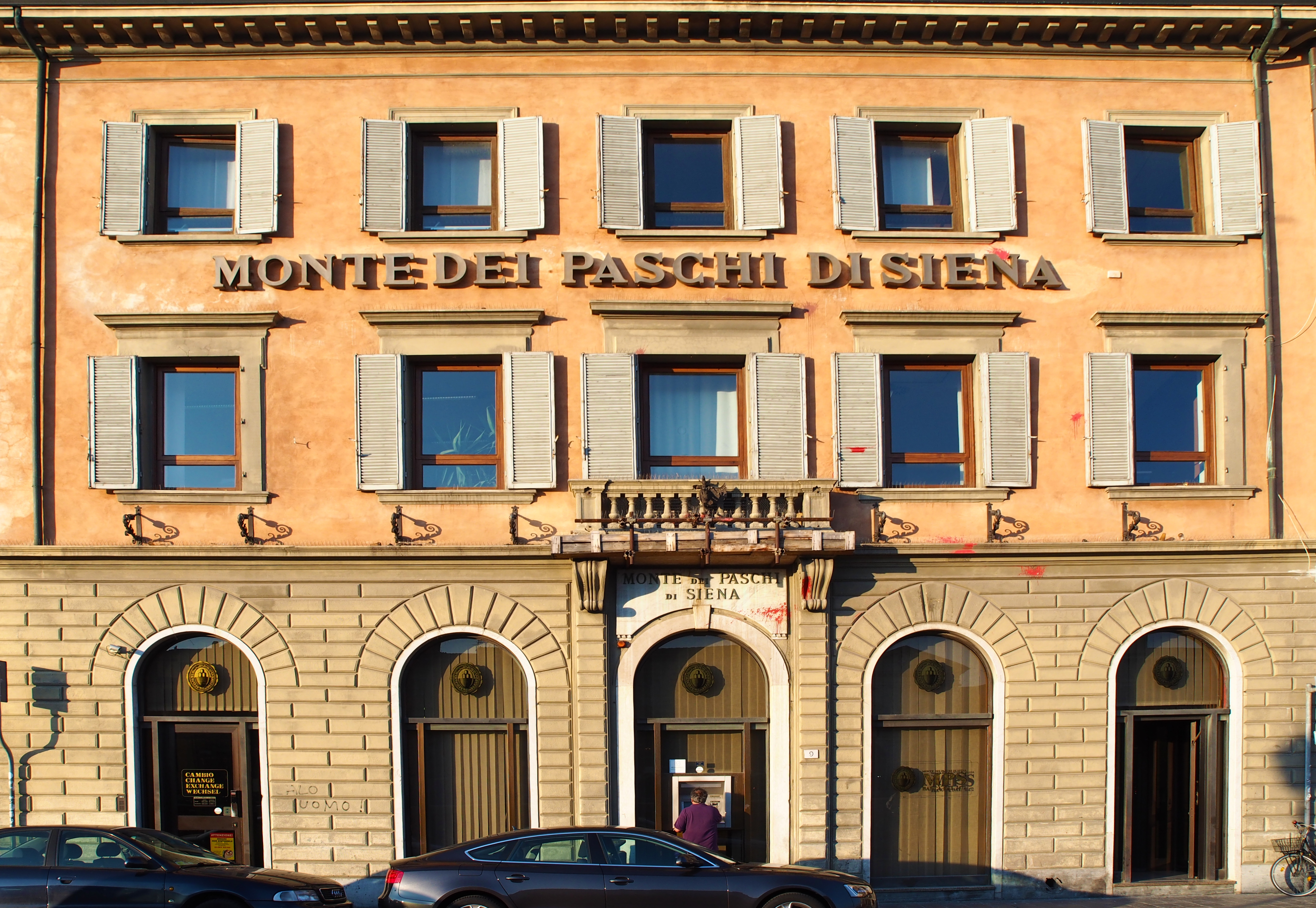
BMPS building in Pisa

After its debut on the Italian Stock Exchange, the bank began an intense phase of commercial and operational expansion. The bank acquired some regional banks: Banca Agricola Mantovana and Banca del Salento, while subsidiary Banca Toscana was absorbed. In 2003, the controlling interests (79%) of Cassa di Risparmio di Prato was sold to Banca Popolare di Vicenza in March 2003 for €411.2 million. The bank had also started a process to reinforce the structures of production in strategic market segments through the development of product companies:

- Consum.it in the sector of consumer credit
- MPS Leasing and Factoring in the parabanking sector
- MPS Finance in investment banking
- MP Asset Management SGR in managed savings
- MPS Personale in financial promotion
- MPS Banca per l'Impresa in credit for businesses and corporate finance services

At the same time, the bank upgraded its commercial productivity, with the aim of improving the level of assistance and consultancy to investors and businesses, and updated its activities in private banking and in private pension plans. At the conclusion of this plan of expansion, the bank implemented a vast program of opening new branches of the Group, with more than 2,000 branches. In order to finance this expansion model, the bank entered into some derivatives that were hidden: operations Santorini in 2002 and Alexandria in 2006.

=== Antonveneta acquisition (2006–2008) ===
On 8 November 2007, Monte dei Paschi di Siena announced that it had reached an agreement with Banco Santander to buy Banca Antonveneta for €9 billion excluding the subsidiary Interbanca that is owned by the Spanish bank. Antonveneta is the bank that after the Bancopoli scandal was acquired by ABN AMRO and was supposed to go to Banco Santander after the purchase of the Dutch bank by the consortium of RBS, Santander, Fortis.

From February 2007 to June 2008 Banca MPS sold all the shares (27.839%) in Finsoe, an intermediate holding company of Unipol Group, for €584.8 million. In 2008, Quadrifoglio Vita, a joint venture insurance company of Unipol and Banca Agricola Mantovana, was acquired by Axa from Unipol via Banca MPS, Banca Agricola Mantovana was also absorbed into Banca MPS.

Banca MPS also acquired regional bank Cassa di Risparmio di Biella e Vercelli from Intesa Sanpaolo in December 2007 for about €399 million.

=== After the 2008 financial crisis ===
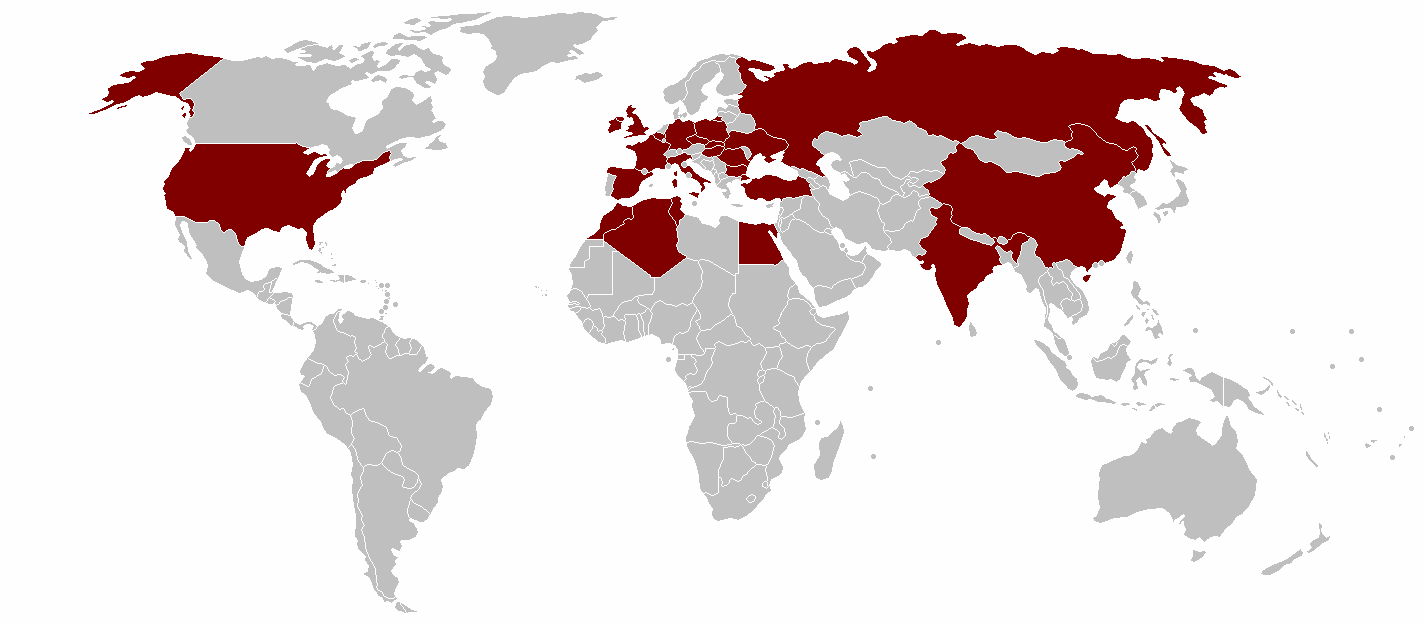
Monte dei Paschi di Siena Group global locations in 2008

After rising yields and declining valuations on Italian government debt during the Euro area crisis, MPS lost over $2 billion in the first half of 2012, had to recapitalize, and faced restructuring or worse. The majority owner until the recapitalization, the Fondazione Monte dei Paschi di Siena, long resisted issuing new capital which would dilute its holding. In September 2012, even after the dilution, the bank "appear[ed] poised" also to give the national government a greater ownership stake in return for more capital.

In December 2012, Cassa di Risparmio di Biella e Vercelli was sold to Cassa di Risparmio di Asti for about €205.5 million.

=== Hidden losses and Bank of Italy bailout (2013) ===
In 2009, the Santorini and Alessandria operations began creating huge losses. In order to hide them in the bank's financial statements, the top management, including Giuseppe Mussari, the bank president, chose to enter into derivative contracts with Deutsche Bank and Nomura. This arrangement eventually led to prison sentences for 13 bank executives.

Estimates of the losses accumulated by the Santorini and Alessandria operations in the period leading up to the derivative contracts range from €500 to €750 million. The documentation concerning these operations was never communicated to the bank's own auditors or the Banca d'Italia. The derivative contracts and related documentation were discovered and made public by the new board of the bank at the end of November 2012. The documentation was then forwarded to the Banca d'Italia between December 2012 and mid-January 2013. The shareholders and the analysts have ascertained that the bank had not declared losses from derivatives. On 22 January 2013, the bank's shares lost 5.6% on the stock exchange and Mussari resigned as president of Associazione Bancaria Italiana.

On 23 January 2013, the scandal of the hidden derivatives was revealed. The bank's shares dropped 8.43% on the stock exchange that day, and another 8% the next day.

On 25 January 2013, an extraordinary general meeting of the shareholders of the bank was convened. They resolved to grant the Board of Directors the power to increase the share capital by a maximum amount of €4.5 billion to service the exercise of conversion rights of the bank of the Monti bonds. MPS called for an intervention of €3.9 billion, including €1.9 billion for the replacement of the previous Tremonti bonds.

The delegation of the extraordinary powers to the Board of Directors has also included the possibility of increasing the share capital of €2 billion at the exclusive service of the payment of interest payable in shares. The shareholders approved with a 98% vote in favour.

After the vote, the bank recovered 11.36% on the stock exchange after having lost more than 20% of its value in three sessions in three days.

On 26 January 2013 the Banca d'Italia (Bank of Italy) approved a bailout request from the bank for €3.9 billion ($5.3 billion).

The firm sparked fresh controversy in 2013 when it was accused of misleading Italy's market regulator in October 2012, shortly before it received a 4.1-billion euro ($5.47 billion) state bailout.

On 29 December 2013, Fondazione Monte dei Paschi di Siena rejected plans for issuing €3 billion worth of new shares, delaying the raising of capital until at least May 2014 and increasing the risk of nationalization.

In November 2019, after a three-year trial, 13 former bank executives received prison sentences. The Monte dei Paschi ex-chairman and CEO received seven years each; two senior executives five and four years. Three bankers from Deutsche Bank received five years and two from Nomura received five and three years. The court decided that they had conspired to hide Monte dei Paschi's losses of €2bn between 2008 and 2012 by using complicated derivative contracts. Deutsche Bank and Nomura were fined €160m; Monte dei Paschi had paid €10.6m after a plea bargain in 2016.

Following an appeal, in May 2022, a Milan appeals court ruling overturned the 2019 conviction of the former executives and the two banks over derivative deals and cancelled the seizures imposed on Deutsche Bank and Nomura Holdings Inc. In October 2023, Italy's Supreme Court of Cassation confirmed the acquittals in Monte dei Paschi derivatives case.

=== A very slow recovery (2014–2022) ===
In March 2014, BlackRock declared a 5.748 percent stake in the bank (as the bank was still a constituent of stock market indices at that time, such as the FTSE MIB, fund managers held stakes in their index tracking funds, and were required to disclose stakes of 5% or higher). In July, the capital increase was completed, of which the banking foundation had just owned 2.500% shares. In October, the bank failed the ECB's stress test of major European banks, (first Comprehensive Assessment of European Banking Supervision) and was given two weeks to prepare a plan to raise €2.11 billion in capital. Despite issuing €5 billion in shares just four months earlier, the ECB declared the bank unable to withstand a financial catastrophe. Shares proceeded to drop 22%. In November, 2014, the bank reported a loss of €1.1497 billion in the 3rd quarter of the year. Eventually in 2014 financial year, the bank had a net loss of €5.3429 billion, resulting in the capital increase to be vaporized. The Tier 1 capital ratio of the bank was 8.7% as at 31 December 2014.

On 6 July 2015, following the Greek bailout referendum, trading in Monte dei Paschi shares was suspended after they fell 5.7%. Eventually Banca MPS achieved a net profit of €388 million in 2015. but mainly due to the effect of the restatement as a CDS derivative of the Alexandria transaction. The CET1 capital ratio of the bank was 12%, mainly due to another capital increase during the year, which the European Central Bank required Banca MPS to have a minimum of 10.75% from 31 December 2016 onward, or 10.2% in the transitional period. Moreover, both the gross (34%) and net non-performing loan to total loan ratio (22%) were still higher than the Italian average (18.1% in gross and 10.8% in net at December 2015) and the Italian average itself was higher than the European Union average.

On 21 January 2016 MPS securitized €1.6 billion performing lease receivables portfolio for a value of €1.4173 billion. The bank repurchased €656 million of the securities (tranches B to D) and sold €761.3 million of the securities to the market (tranche A).

In April 2016 German Bundesbank board member Andreas Dombret commented that many Greek and Italian banks were zombie banks that were kept for political reasons. He urged that European Central Bank should deal with banks with high level of non-performing loans. However, he did not state specifically if BMPS was one of the zombie banks or not.

On 23 June a gross value of €290 million bad loan portfolio was disposed of without recourse to Kruk Group. On 4 July the bank confirmed that a request of reducing non-performing loans from European Central Bank was received. In 2015 the bank had €46.9 billion NPLs in gross and €24.2 billion in net. The bank targeted to reduce the gross NPLs to total loans ratio to 20% in 2018. However, this was still higher than the Italian average at 31 December 2015.

On 29 July 2016, 2016 European Union bank stress test was announced. Among the 51 banks in the test, BMPS was the only bank that CET1 ratio (in full Basel III basis) was forecast as negative in the adverse scenario in 2018. If setting CET1 Ratio and Total Capital Ratio (fully loaded basis) targets at 8% and 11.5% respectively even in the adverse scenario in 2018, it would mean the bank would have a capital shortfall of €8.8 billion (core tier 1, additional tier 1 and tier 2 capitals combined), according to European Central Bank publication on 29 December 2016.

On the same day, the plan to recapitalize the bank for €5 billion was announced; the bank also planned to securitize the entire bad loan portfolio for a target of €9.2 billion, which had a net book value of €10.2 billion as at 31 March 2016. The junior tranche would be allocated to the shareholders of the bank (for a proposed €1.6 billion); the mezzanine tranche would be sold to Atlante for €1.6 billion (revised to purchase junior mezzanine tranche for €1.526 billion in December 2016); the senior tranches would be sold to the market with some of them being eligible to state guarantee (Garanzia sulla Cartolarizzazione delle Sofferenze) for €6 billion. It was expected to reduce the gross NPLs ratio to 17.8%, on par with Italian average but still higher than many European peers. In December 2016, the disposal plan was modified: a senior mezzanine tranche (for €1.171 billion) was added—to be underwritten by the bank itself.

In September 2016, CEO Fabrizio Viola and chairman Massimo Tononi resigned. They were replaced by Marco Morelli and Alessandro Falciai, respectively.

On 28 November 2016, every 100 BMPS shares were converted into one new BMPS share and, on 2 December 2016, AXA and BMPS announced a renewal of their partnership bancassurance—an agreement intended to prevail until 2027.

In December 2016, BMPS successfully made debt-to-equity swap for part of their subordinated debt and Tier 1 capital instrument, for a maximum price of €24.9 per new share (on top of €5 billion new shares issue). In mid-December, BMPS reopened the offer for the swap, which reached approx. €2.451 billion. However, due to the failure to issue €5 billion new shares, the swap offer and disposal of NPLs were voided. Although J.P. Morgan, Mediobanca, Banco Santander, Bank of America Merrill Lynch, Citigroup, Credit Suisse, Deutsche Bank and Goldman Sachs had signed a pre-underwriting agreement with BMPS in July. No banks and no anchor investor entered into contracts with BMPS.

At 01:20am, on 23 December 2016, the midnight after the failed recapitalisation, BMPS requested a precautionary recapitalisation by the Italian Government in order to bail out the bank by excising Article 32(4) of EU Bank Recovery and Resolution Directive (The EU-wide banking resolution law, which restricted state aid to a mean of last resort). On 20 December the Italian Government had already raised €20 billion to set up a save-savings (Italian: salva-risparmio) fund in order to subscribe a possible recapitalisation of UniCredit, BMPS, Banca Popolare di Vicenza, Veneto Banca and Banca Carige, as well as banks that need recapitalisation in the near future.

It was reported that the subordinate bond would be mandatorily converted to shares by the resolution authority of Italy (which is Bank of Italy) as a "bail-in". However, the bank had requested a Tier 2 subordinate capital instrument "Fresh 2008" excluded from such bail-in, as many investors were retail investors.

On 25 January 2017 BMPS issued bonds with €7 billion face value. The bonds would mature from 1 to 3 years, with the state guarantee from the aforementioned government fund. The bank said the bond would be sold to the market or used as a collateral in borrowing process.

On 3 February 2017 BMPS sold its card business to Istituto Centrale delle Banche Popolari Italiane (ICBPI) for €520 million. Other leading banks of Italy, such as Intesa Sanpaolo and UniCredit had already sold their division in 2016.

On 9 February 2017 BMPS announced their 2016 financial results subject to the approval of general shareholders' meeting. The bank 2016 revenue, net interest income and pre-provision profit were decreased, compared to 2015. Combined with the write-down and provisions for NPLs, the net loss of the year was €3.380 billion. The CET1 ratio was reaching the legal minimal threshold of 8.0% (below ECB requirement in individual basis on the bank for 10.75%)

On 1 June 2017 European Commissioner Margrethe Vestager agreed in-principle for the state aid of the bank. On 5 July, the industrial plan of the bank was approved, which the bank would be re-capitalized for €8.1 billion, but only €3.9 billion would be underwritten by the Ministry of Economy and Finance (excluding additional shares that would be buyback from retail bondholders by the government), with the rest were the "bail-in" of bondholders, mandatorily converted the bond of the bank to shares.

On 29 July, the bank announced that the issue price of the new shares to the government was €6.49, with €8.65 for debt-to-equity shares.

Stefania Bariatti replaced her predecessor as chairperson of MPS during December 2017.

On 5 October 2018, BMPS announced the sale of its Belgian subsidiary, Banca Monte Paschi Belgio (BMPB), to a company participated in by funds managed by Warburg Pincus. The sale price was set at €42 million, subject to an adjustment mechanism. Between 2018 and 2020 the bank made 49.8% of its pre-tax profits in tax havens.

=== Return to profitability & privatisation (2023–2024) ===
On 20 November 2023, the Italian government sold a 25% stake in MPS, thus partially privatising the bank and reducing the government's stake from 64% to 39%.

After a €178mn loss in 2022, MPS returned to full-year profit with record earnings of just over €2bn for 2023. In February 2024, MPS paid its first dividend since 2010, returning €315mn to shareholders.

On 27 March 2024, the Italian government sold a further 12.5% stake in MPS, for about €650 million. This sell further cuts Italy's stake in MPS, reducing it to 26.7% from 39.2%, and advances the government's plan to privatise MPS.

On 14 November 2024, the Italian government sold a 15% stake in MPS for €1.1bn, thus reducing its stake in MPS to 11.7% from 26.7%, and Banco BPM seized the opportunity of the sale to buy a 5% position in MPS while Anima Holding bought a 3% stake in MPS. With this sale, the Italian government respects the privatisation commitments it made to the EU (during the 2017 bailout of MPS) to reduce its stake below 20% by the end of 2024.

=== The acquisition of Mediobanca (2025–2026) ===
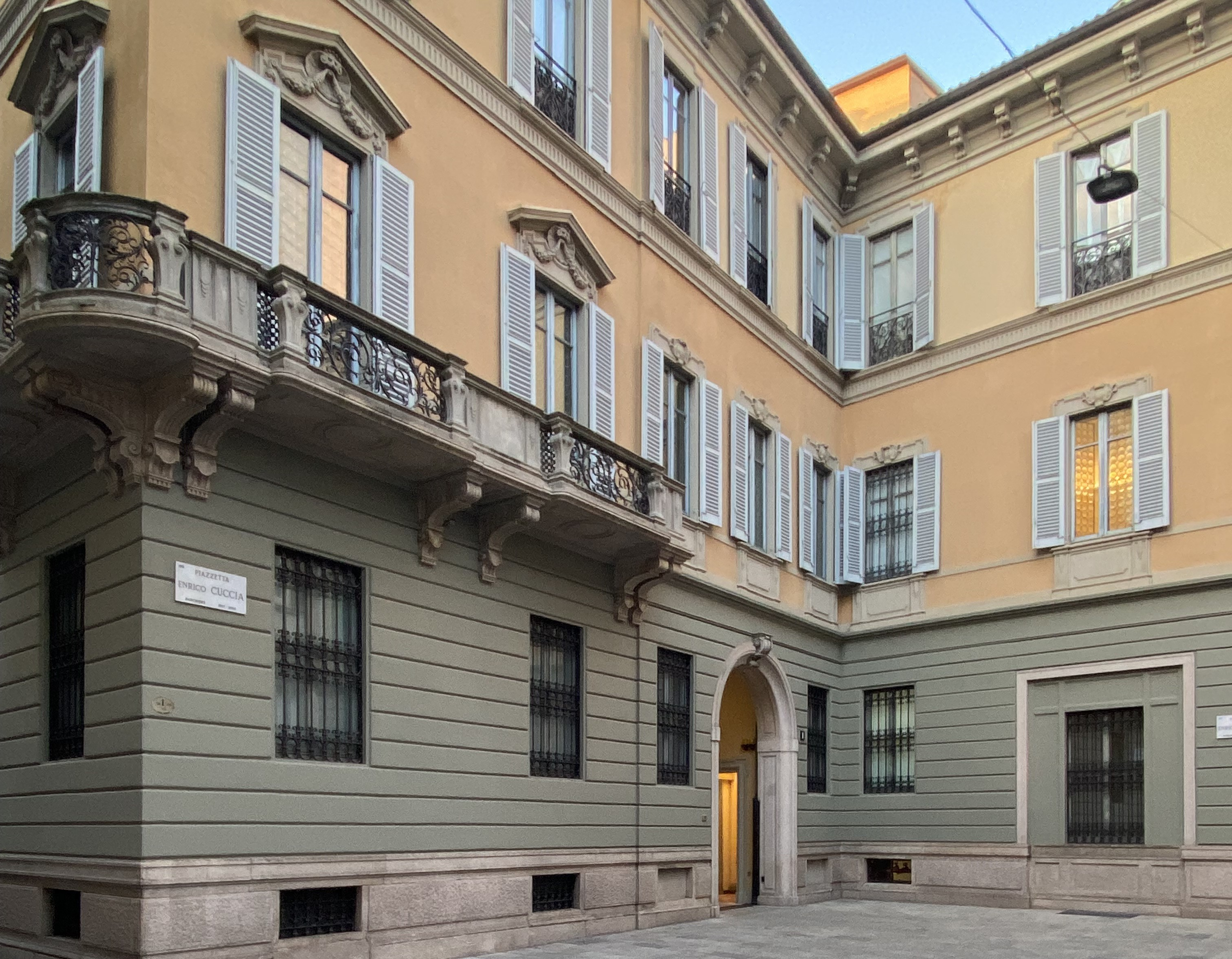
Mediobanca S.p.A - Headquarters - Piazzetta Enrico Cuccia, Milan

On 24 January 2025, MPS announced the launch of a 13.3 billion euro takeover bid for larger rival Mediobanca. On 3 April 2025, Governance adviser Glass Lewis recommended that Monte dei Paschi (MPS) shareholders approve a share issue to support MPS's proposed takeover of investment bank Mediobanca, with the vote set for April 17, 2025. While acknowledging risks—such as cultural integration and disruption to Mediobanca's operations—Glass Lewis sees a solid strategic and financial rationale behind the deal. On 29 August 2025, MPS held 27.1% of Mediobanca's share capital, and the minimum threshold for the success of the takeover bid was reached after a few days.

On 4 September 2025, MPS reached the minimum threshold for the success of the takeover bid of 35% of Mediobanca's share capital. On 9 September 2025, MPS's takeover bid was successful and reached 62.29% of Mediobanca's share capital. On 18 September 2025, Alberto Nagel resigned along with the board of directors of Mediobanca. His resignation will be effective at the shareholders' meeting convened on October 28 to renew the board of directors for the three-year term 2026–2028. On 23 September 2025, MPS acquired up to 86.33% of Mediobanca's capital. This does not imply the immediate delisting of Mediobanca shares; the expected threshold is 90%. On 29 September 2025, with the acquisition of Mediobanca, the shareholder reorganization of Monte dei Paschi di Siena will take place, with Delfin having a majority stake of 17.5% of the entire group consisting of Monte dei Paschi and Mediobanca and its subsidiaries. On 3 October 2025, MPS finalized the list of members of the new board of directors of Mediobanca. On 17 February 2026, MPS board of directors approved the delisting of Mediobanca from the Milan stock exchange and its complete merger into MPS.

=== The shareholding in Assicurazioni Generali (2025–2026) ===
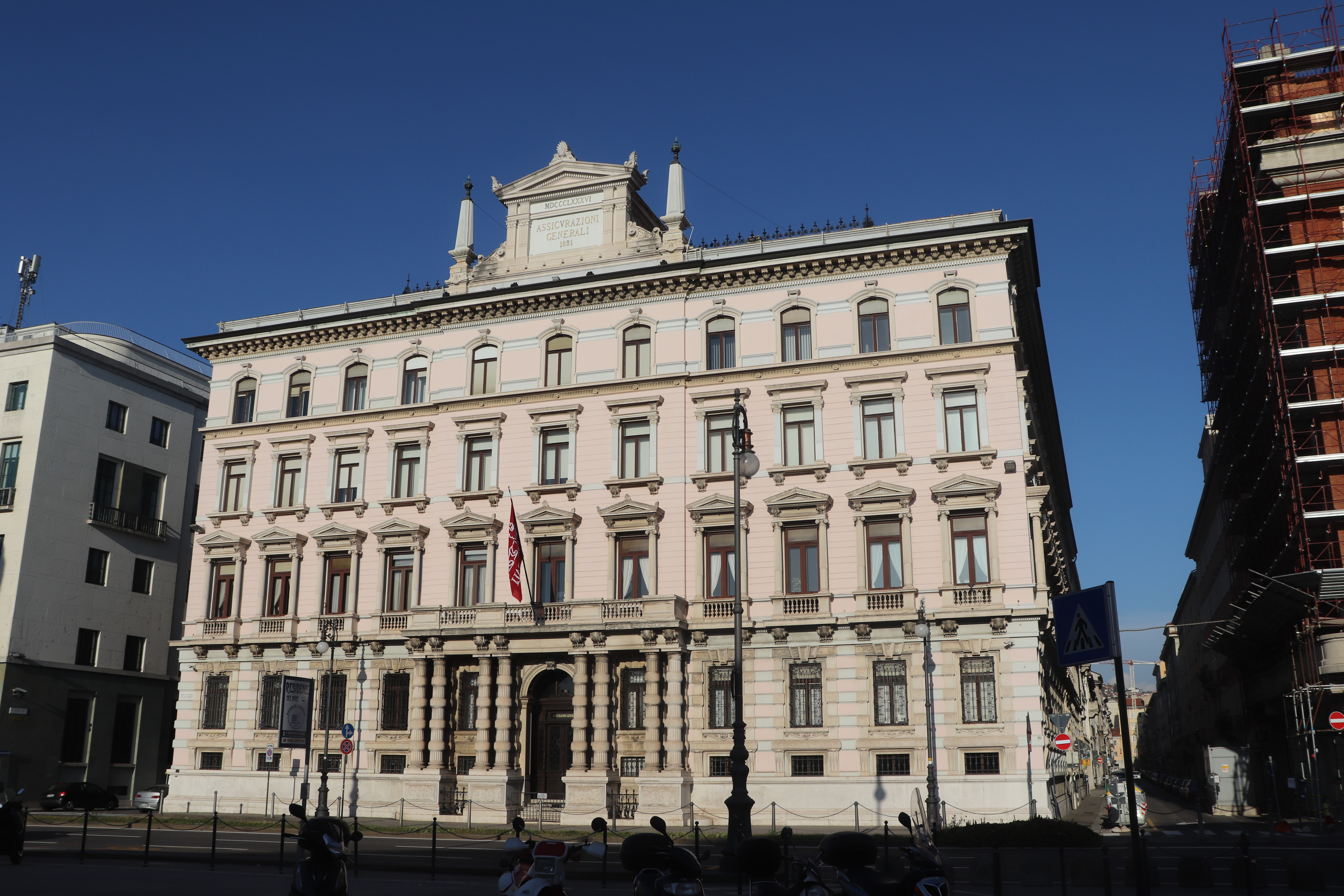
Palazzo Generali, Headquarter of Assicurazioni Generali, Trieste

On 1 October 2025, with the successful takeover bid for Mediobanca, MPS now owns Mediobanca's 13.19% stake in Assicurazioni Generali. Meanwhile, Assicurazioni Generali controls Banca Generali, which was the target of Mediobanca's attempted defensive takeover bid. Mediobanca's takeover bid for Banca Generali was launched on 28 April 2025, a takeover bid to defend itself from the takeover bid launched by MPS, but it was unsuccessful which opened the way of successful of MPS's bid for Mediobanca.

=== Intesa Sanpaolo takeover bid with the participation of BPER (2026–present) ===
On June 8, 2026, Intesa Sanpaolo launched a takeover bid for the full acquisition of the entire Monte dei Paschi di Siena group (thus including Mediobanca, and the shareholding in Generali, which in turn controls Banca Generali). BPER is involved in the deal to sell a number of Monte dei Paschi di Siena branches and to transfer the Monte dei Paschi di Siena brand to BPER, once Intesa Sanpaolo completes the acquisition. In the deal, Intesa Sanpaolo is offering a cash bonus for each share brought into the deal, as well as giving new Intesa Sanpaolo shares to the Monte dei Paschi di Siena shareholder who takes part in the takeover bid. The main goal of Intesa Sanpaolo's operation is to take control of Generali and integrate Mediobanca into its structure, as well as to acquire all the capital of Monte dei Paschi di Siena.

However, the market operation would therefore dismantle the so-called third pole or pillar of Italian savings, which has been a target of the Italian government, and would make a prestigious banking brand with an undisputed reputation disappear or be redefined, which just a few years ago was secured with a huge expenditure of public funds by the Italian government.

If Intesa Sanpaolo's operation were successful and it acquired Monte Paschi di Siena, after the expected synergies, in 2027 Intesa Sanpaolo would have a market capitalization of 230 billion euros.

=== Double takeover bid for BPM and Banca Generali (2026) ===
On 20 August 2026, Monte dei Paschi di Siena launched a double bid to acquire Banco BPM and Banca Generali. The double operation by Monte dei Paschi di Siena is launched from a defensive perspective to protect itself from the acquisition attempt by Intesa Sanpaolo. However, Intesa Sanpaolo would be able to await all acquisitions of Monte dei Paschi di Siena and subsequently acquire again the entire group. With the completion of the dual operation of Monte dei Paschi di Siena, after the expected synergies with the acquired companies, in 2028, Monte dei Paschi di Siena would have a market capitalization of approximately 120 billion euros.

Both operations are seen as beneficial by savers and shareholders, and generally by the market, because they create value and further develop the potential of all the banking parties involved, as part of strengthening the Italian banking system in Europe.

== Cultural and economic-development ==
MPS headquarters in the Palazzo Salimbeni in Siena hosts an art collection and a large number of priceless historical documents spanning the centuries of its existence. However, this collection is not usually open to the public. The most recent publicly known acquisition of art, a gold-plated panel by Segna di Bonaventura, cost the bank nearly one million Euro. It is also internationally known as the primary sponsor of Italian basketball club Mens Sana Basket of Siena, currently in Lega A and a regular participant in the Euroleague.

In 2010, the bank was funding the expansion of a small airport in the heart of the Tuscan countryside, Siena–Ampugnano Airport, to become an international airport. Both international and local groups had raised objections to this expansion on the grounds it would damage the natural beauty of the area, the environment and the attraction of the countryside to tourism. Eventually, Aeroporto di Siena S.p.A., the company incorporated for the project, was liquidated .

Until the euro-crisis, profits from the bank financed the Palio di Siena, Siena's historic-building renovations and "biotech programs" intended to turn the Tuscan plain into a research hub. Nearly all that money – $150 million a year, on average, from 1996 to 2010 – has "evaporated" since 2010.

According to the annual report of the banking foundation, which acted as both the largest shareholders of the bank and the charity organization for Tuscan area, the foundation suffered a sharp decrease in revenue from the bank in 2009, which dropped from €340 million to just €62.5 million, thus affecting the endowment to other organizations. Along with other loss related and not related to the bank since 2010, the foundation had to suspend all the endowment to other organizations.

== Fondazione Monte dei Paschi di Siena ==
The share owned by Fondazione Monte dei Paschi di Siena dropped from over 55% on 31 December 2009 to below CONSOB requirement to disclose (<2%) in 2015.

Since the 1936 statute 16 members of the Fondazione Monte dei Paschi di Siena were appointed by local authorities: 8 members by the Municipality of Siena, 5 by the province of Siena, 1 by the University of Siena, 1 by the Tuscany Region and the last by the Archdiocese of Siena-Colle di Val d’Elsa-Montalcino. The Foundation appoints the MPS governing body whose governance and operations have been highly influenced by Italian politics since the 20th century. Further research is needed to clarify the degree of this relationship, which involved some exponents of the governing body who were closely connected to Italian Freemasonry.

== Shareholders ==
As of May 2026, Monte dei Paschi's main shareholders were:

Shareholder	% of Capital
Delfin S.à r.l.	17.53%
Caltagirone	10.26%
Ministry of Economy and Finance	4.86%
BlackRock	4.66%
Banco BPM S.p.A.	3.74%
Other Shareholders	58.95%

== See also ==
- List of oldest companies
- List of banks in the euro area
- List of banks in Italy
- Death of David Rossi
