= Alberto Nagel =

Italian banker and manager

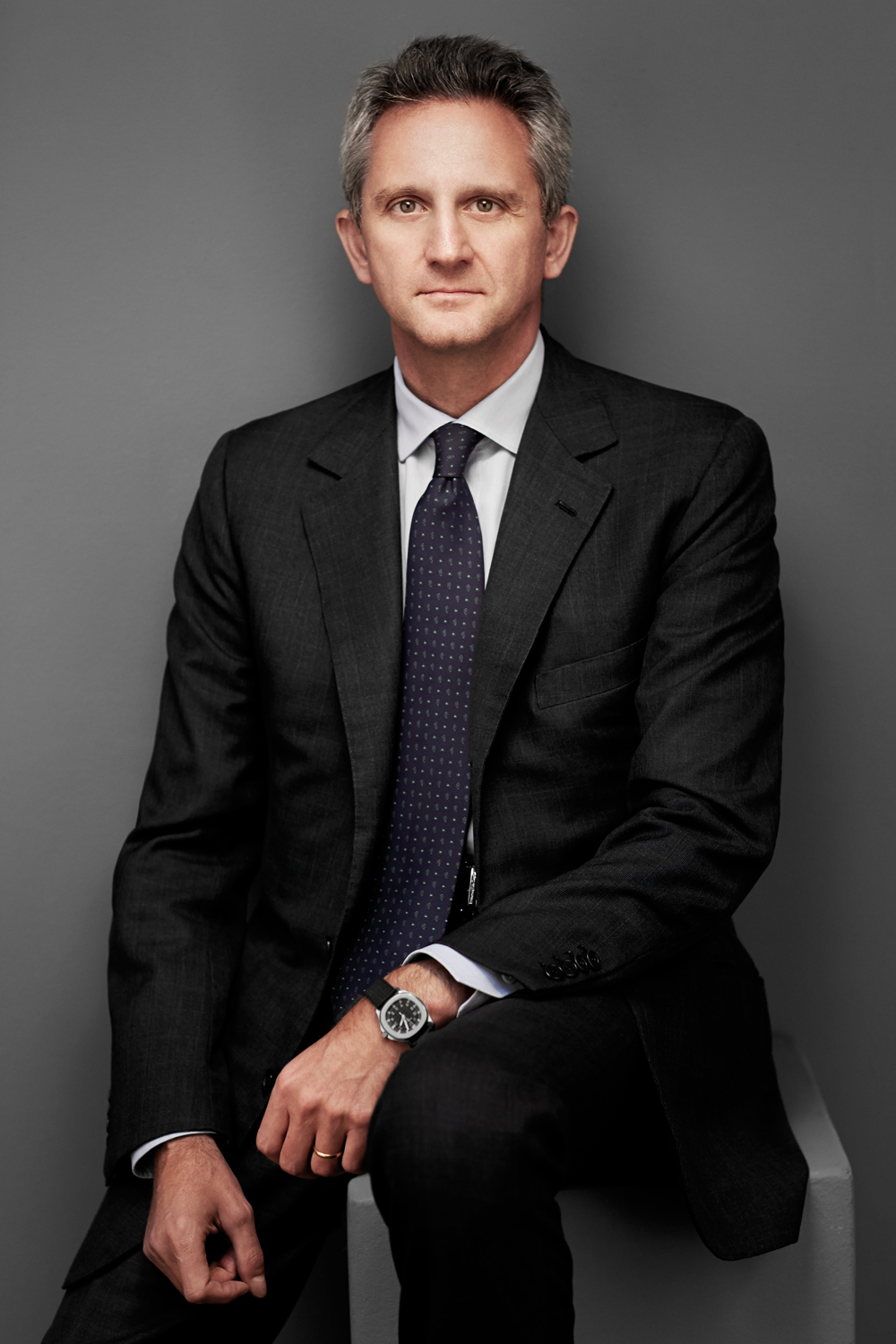
- Nagel in 2025
- Born: 7 June 1965 (age 61); Milan, Italy
- Occupations: Banker and business executive
- Known for: CEO of Mediobanca
- Children: Two

Alberto Nagel (Milan, 7 June 1965) is an Italian banker and business executive who is CEO of Mediobanca.

Alberto Nagel has spent his whole working life at Mediobanca. Nagel has led the bank through its entry to international markets, and driven a transformation of its business model. The bank today is focused on Wealth Management services, which it provides with its Corporate & Investment Banking division. Following the changes that have taken place in the global banking sector since th 1990s, Nagel’s focus has been geared towards moving beyond the holding company model by increasing the group’s diversification and specialization, to create the first Private & Investment Bank in Italy.

The transformation of Mediobanca has emerged most clearly during the most recent decade of Alberto Nagel’s leadership (2013-23), during which the bank has delivered a total shareholder return of 270%, as a combined result of both an approx. 160% increase in stock market price and €4bn in dividends returned to shareholders, without having to implement rights issues or capital increases unlike many other Italian banks during the financial crises.

Alberto Nagel was reappointed as CEO by the shareholders of Mediobanca at the Annual General Meeting held in October 2023, and is now the longest-serving CEO of any bank included in the FTSE MIB index.

== Career in Mediobanca ==
Alberto Nagel joined Mediobanca in 1991, and has spent his entire career working for the bank. To begin with he worked in the Finance division, before moving to the General Secretariat, of which he was made Head in 1997. As the bank’s organizational structure changed, he later became Head of the Investment Banking division.

=== Privatizations and M&A ===
In the 1990s he was involved in some of the largest M&A deals executed in Italy, and participated in the major privatizations covered by Mediobanca, including Enel (1999), BNL (1998) and Finmeccanica (2000).

In 1994 and 1995 he covered the tender offer of Credito Romagnolo by Credito Italiano. In 1999 he was involved in the tender offer launched by Olivetti for Telecom Italia. And in 2000 and 2001 he took part in the tender offer by Generali for INA. Nagel was also one of the leading players in the consolidation processes between the Italian co-operating banks that took place during the same period.

=== New Group strategy ===
It was a suggestion made by Alberto Nagel to his predecessor Vincenzo Maranghi, which he also discussed with the founder of Mediobanca, Enrico Cuccia, that led to the establishment of Banca Esperia from a joint venture with Banca Mediolanum in 2001, with the objective of providing support to the entrepreneurs who were already clients of the bank in managing the wealth generated by the M&A deals covered by Mediobanca in its investment banking activity. The project would prove to be crucial for the transformation of the bank’s business model, a process which Nagel, as CEO, would himself drive forward for a period of more than fifteen years, managing in particular the Wealth Management services that are distinguished by the synergies generated by the bank’s Corporate & Investment Banking activities.

On 21 June 2013 he unveiled the bank’s 2014-16 strategic plan, with which Mediobanca accelerated and completed the disposal process of its long-standing equity investments, thus freeing up capital to be invested for the growth of its business activities and international expansion. The plan received broad coverage from both the Italian media and the international media, which described it as a turning point for Italian capitalism.

=== Corporate & Investment Banking: international development ===
Alberto Nagel led the expansion of Mediobanca’s Corporate & Investment Banking activities in international markets (non-domestic revenues accounted for 40% of the Group’s top line in 2023 and are expected to reach 55% by 2026), which included opening branch offices in Paris (2004), Luxembourg (2005), Frankfurt, Madrid and New York (2007), London (2008), and Istanbul (2013). The CEO has also completed two international acquisitions relating to its investment banking activities, namely French investment boutique Messier Maris & Associés (2019), and UK-based Arma Partners, an international leader in M&A advisory services in the digital economy segment.

=== Debut in Wealth Management ===
In May 2008 Alberto Nagel designed the setting up of CheBanca!, a retail which initially operated exclusively through digital channels, with the aim of diversifying the group’s sources of funding by bringing in €13bn in deposits in the first three years of its activity. CheBanca! would gradually evolve into a wealth manager in support of the strategy devised by Nagel, and the new, multichannel service model would be consolidated in 2015 with the acquisition of a selected area of Barclay’s Italian retail activities.

At end 2015 this growth in retail banking was consolidated with the acquisition of Barclays’ italian retail banking activities. In the same year Nagel launched Mediobanca's involvement in the alternative asset management segment with the acquisition of a controlling interest in UK-based credit asset manager Cairn Capital. Following the acquisition of Bybrook Capital in 2021, the two companies were combined to form Polus Capital, now a leading player in the alternative credit segment. These two acquisitions in the asset management area were complemented by the addition, in 2017, of RAM Active Investments, based in Switzerland, and the three together would prove fundamental in completing Mediobanca’s progression towards the specialist financial group model which was Nagel’s objective following the change of strategy previously implemented.

In 2016 Nagel unveiled the Group’s strategic plan up to 2019, one of the main pillars of which was to accelerate development of the Wealth Management activities in synergy with the Corporate & Investment Banking division. This objective provided the rationale for the acquisition of full control of Banca Esperia, which Nagel announced when the plan was unveiled, and served as the basis from which Mediobanca Private Banking was created. This division, the mission of which is to manage the wealth of some of Italy’s most prosperous entrepreneurial families, by the end of FY 2022-23 had posted TFAs of €88bn, driven in particular by the leadership position it has consolidated in the Private Markets segment through agreements and coinvestment programmes developed in conjunction with some of the leading global investment managers, including BlackRock, Apollo and UBS.

=== Growth in Consumer Finance ===
Alberto Nagel has also worked to develop the Mediobanca group’s Consumer Finance division, represented by Compass, initially through the acquisition and merger of Linea in 2007-8. Since then the focus has shifted to investments in digital services and the launch of international diversification. Compass is active in the Buy Now Pay Later segment, and its operations in this area have expanded with two acquisitions, Italian fintech Soisy (2022) and Swiss-based operator HeidiPay (2023), now fully integrated, which has enabled Compass to become a consumer credit operator in Switzerland as well as Italy.

=== Strategic Plan 2023-26: “One Brand-One Culture” ===
On 24 May 2023 Alberto Nagel unveiled the Strategic Plan 2023-26 “One Brand-One Culture”, with which Mediobanca intends to complete its transformation to become a “leading wealth manager”, by leveraging in particular on the Private & Investment Banking model, in which investment banking services are offered in conjunction with services to grow and manage clients’ wealth. The CEO’s strategy is to deliver growth for the bank that will enable it to return €3.7bn to its shareholders over the course of the three years, equal to 45% of Mediobanca’s market capitalization at the time when the plan was unveiled, corresponding to a payout ratio of 70%.

One of the main objectives of the strategic plan presented by Alberto Nagel is to pursue growth in the areas of digital innovation (through a recruitment drive in which staff with technology capabilities will increase by 15% over the three years, and the joint venture with Founders Factory announced in July 2023 to develop fintech projects in support of the group’s technology ecosystem) and ESG, with interim targets to achieve carbon neutrality by 2050 in accordance with the group’s membership of the Net-Zero Banking Alliance, over €20m to be invested in projects with social impact, and ESG criteria included in the staff evaluation and remuneration policies for the group’s entire corporate population and for senior management in particular.

On 16 January 2024 Alberto Nagel unveiled Mediobanca Premier to the press. Mediobanca Premier is a bank specializing in wealth management and investments for Italian households, which the CEO described as the “single most important project” in the Strategic Plan 2023-26 “One Brand-One Culture”. During the press conference Nagel spoke of the “huge potential” of the segment targeted by Mediobanca Premier, which is what drove the decision to promote Mediobanca-branded offices in the main cities of Italy, a historical change in the development of a brand that has been seen as exclusive and considered inaccessible for virtually the whole of the bank’s history.

== Management style ==
=== Public image ===
Through his management of Mediobanca and his public image, Alberto Nagel is considered to be one of the main custodians of the management culture authored by the bank’s founder Enrico Cuccia, and handed down by Cuccia’s successor Vincenzo Maranghi, in conjunction with other long-standing collaborators. In line with the bank’s tradition, Nagel chooses to maintain a reserved profile, not giving interviews or making public statements outside of the official occasions in which he engages with financial analysts and journalists. In any case on such occasions Nagel addresses primarily matters pertaining to Mediobanca’s business, and the style he adopts is focused and factual.

=== Governance structure ===
Despite his reserved style, Alberto Nagel made decisive changes to the governance of Mediobanca and intervened significantly in the management of the group’s investee companies in the years between 2008 and 2011 primarily. As a result, Mediobanca returned to the traditional from the dualistic system of governance, and collected a total of €3.3bn from the sale of stakes held in other companies, thus facilitating the bank’s development from a holding company model to that of a specialized financial group.

=== Fondiaria-SAI rescue ===
Adopting the same reserved, pragmatic approach Alberto Nagel helped rescue the insurance group Fondiaria-SAI, to which it had an exposure of over €1bn, with its sale to Unipol in 2013, thus removing possible effects on the stability of Mediobanca. Nagel lead-managed the deal, which was completed in conjunction with other investment banks, commenting on it only later in saying that none of the leading European insurance companies had expressed any “interest in the group as a whole”, and stating that the solution adopted for the company’s rescue, based on the identification of an “industrial partner”, guaranteed “solidity and durability”.

=== Relations with investors ===
One of the features that distinguish Alberto Nagel’s management style includes his focus on investor relations and efforts to protect independence of management. Nagel referenced his engagement with investors in the only statement he made when he was reappointed in 2023. Nagel’s reappointment, in conjunction with that of the Board in October 2023, was achieved primarily on the back of his relations with financial markets, consolidated by the increasing presence of institutional investors among the bank’s shareholders in the more than fifteen years now that Nagel has led the Milan-based bank. Such investment has been encouraged and consolidated by the creation of value from both share price increases and dividends (translating to a total shareholder return pari of 270% in the 2013-23 period).

The relationship with institutional investors and with the largest investment funds is solid, with regard to the bank’s ownership structure, and also when Mediobanca advises on complex Corporate & Investment Banking deals, such as when Blackstone, one of the largest investment management companies in the world. Mediobanca was retained in 2022 to advise the Benetton family on the takeover of Atlantia, making the bank led by Nagel the architect of world’s biggest delisting.

The Board of Directors of Mediobanca was reappointed by its shareholders at the Annual General Meeting held on 28 October 2023. The slate presented by the outgoing BoD, in which Alberto Nagel was candidate for the position of CEO, obtained 52.6% of the votes, made up of the votes of the institutional investors (primarily some of the leading global investment managers) plus those of the shareholders that are parties to the consultation agreement (which brings together the stakes held by some of the best-known entrepreneurs and family-owned holding companies in the Italian industrial panorama). On this occasion the financial market operators strongly backed Alberto Nagel’s management, outvoting the 30% of the share capital owned by the heirs of Leonardo Del Vecchio and by Francesco Gaetano Caltagirone, shareholders who had engaged in a “power struggle” with Nagel.

== Other positions held ==
Alberto Nagel served as Statutory Auditor of Assicurazioni Generali from 1996 until 2004, when he became a Director of the company. In 2010 he was appointed Deputy Chairman of Assicurazioni Generali, a position form which he resigned in April 2012, after changes were made to the Italian legislation by the government led by Mario Monti, making it impossible for Directors to hold positions on the Boards of both banks and insurance companies simultaneously.

He served as Director of Banca Esperia from July 2000 to April 2012.

He was also a member of the Board of the Italian banking association (Associazione Bancaria Italiana, or “ABI”), from 2007 to 2012.

== Personal life ==
Alberto Nagel is married with two children. He lives in Italy but divides his time between Milan and London where he works part of the week.
