= Giuseppe Mascitelli =

Italian businessman involved in banking, insurance and television

- Born: 9 November 1959 (age 66); Porto San Giorgio, Italy
- Education: University of Urbino
- Occupation: Businessperson
- Known for: Communications expert in finance and business, business TV channels
- Spouse: Antonella Mascitelli
- Children: 3

Giuseppe Mascitelli (born 9 November 1959) is an Italian entrepreneur and innovator known for his work in corporate communications and digital media. A graduate in Philosophy from the University of Urbino, Mascitelli has been instrumental in integrating technology with communication strategies, coining the term "Tecnocreativo" to describe professionals adept in both technological and humanistic domains.

In 1998, he co-founded Alboran S.p.A. with Ennio Doris, launching Italy's first business television channel. Mascitelli was CEO of Mediolanum Comunicazione S.p.A. from 1996 to 2011, overseeing the development of the Mediolanum Channel and the Mediolanum Market Forum. Additionally, he founded Filmare Group, a holding company encompassing various initiatives in communication and media.

In the 2020s, Mascitelli has focused on immersive digital experiences, founding Home SeTv to bring virtual reality into everyday settings. He has also been a business management consultant of Banca Mediolanum S.p.A. His work continues to influence the intersection of technology, communication, and human experience.

== Early life and education ==
Giuseppe Mascitelli was born on 9 November 1959 in Porto San Giorgio, a small town in Marche overlooking the Adriatic sea. He attended a scientific high school, first in Fermo then in Civitanova Marche.

He left his family at a young age for his university studies, which he financed by working in various jobs. He traveled in Europe and lived for several months in Northern Germany near Marberg and Essen in order to become more confident with German to help with his graduation thesis.

In 1983 he graduated in History of Philosophy with a thesis on "Max Stirner - The Ego and Its Own" at the University of Urbino. In that same year he started a master in Economics at the same university, finishing in 1985. From 1983 to 1990 he shifted his attention to the financial sector, attending training courses at Programma Italia. Finally in 1994 he completed his masters concentrated on Financial and Insurance markets.

== Career ==
Giuseppe Mascitelli's has worked in the banking world and television.

=== Banking ===
Meeting Ennio Doris in 1983 was the turning point in Giuseppe's journey into the banking world. From 1983 to 1988 he was an agent, then supervisor, and finally manager at Programma Itaia. In 1988 he changed roles and became head of training for central Italy, a position that he maintained until 1990 - the year of his second turning point - that lead him to become business management consultant of the same company until 1997. This position was renewed by Banca Mediolanum until 2011. From 2008 to 2011 he has also been a member of the board of Mediolanum Corporate University.

=== Creative world ===
His path in communications took place parallel to his banking activities from the early 1980s. In this period he produced a series of popular publications aimed at bringing Italian consumers closer to the investment world, and to the design one of the first European business TV stations. In 1994 Giuseppe became Sole Director of Filmare, a position that he maintained until 2009. From 1998 to 1999 he was president of Magic General Media S.p.A., leaving to become, President and then CEO of Alboran S.p.A. until 2005. From 1996 to 2011 he has also CEO Of Mediolanum Communication, a company that was established with the aim of managing the entire communications branch (from Branding to all international events) of Banca Mediolanum.

=== Other activities ===
In the 1990s he was involved in the production of one of the first business TV stations, defined by Ennio Doris as "the real secret weapon of Banca Mediolanum". This experience would later be applied to the creation of other company TV stations such as Pirelli & C. Real Estate, Wellcome datamatic S.p.A. and Deutsche Bank. In this period he also created the Mediolanum Tour, a traveling show. He went on to launch the Mediolanum Channel, a theme channel in cooperation with Sky, and of the Mediolanum Market Forum, a cross-media format transmitted live in four languages - both on the Internet platform as well as via satellite. He has been the designer and creator of all Banca Mediolanum events and conventions.

=== TV programs ===
Giuseppe Mascitelli has been author and creator of various television programs. In the 1990s he created the first telesales on Italian television, carried out in the Mediaset studios in 1992 with Marco Columbro. Next he developed "Pensione Completa" broadcast on the syndications Rete A and Odeon TV, with the TV debut of Ennio Doris and "Una città per cantare" which saw the return of Mike Bongiorno live, a format that was later inherited by Maurizio Costanzo and Fiorello. Also in the 1990s he directed the show and created the DVD of a live Milan concert of Fausto Leali.

He created many formats for Mediolanum Channel from "Gente di mare" to " Piccolo fratello" but most notably were the experimental activities carried out in new media - an unexpected format for Italian culture - such as "My virtual boy", the first ideal programmable boy via Web and presented during the Future Show of the same year (the project gave rise to a movie produced by Warner Bros) and "BlackCube", a reality format similar to Grande Fratello, in which the participants were forced into a closed environment, precisely the black cube, and they had to resolve 6 enigmas posed by a computer. Their story was filmed and transmitted both via website and satellite channels, which could be altered and enriched by public participation through special web-live interfaces. "BlackCube", in 2001 had over 300,000 hits on line.

== Recognition ==
Among the main awards he received were the 1995 "Lifetime achievement Global winner" - Programma Italia. The 2001 "Hot Bird TV Award" - Special Prize at the SAT Expo. The 2004 "TV digitali in chiaro" a Mediolanum Channel for production refinement - 30 anni di Mille Canali. The 2006 "TV programmes" for Piccolo Fratello - Premio Aretè - responsible for communication; 2008 "1st prize Convention Aziendale" with the event Anno Domini - Bea, "2nd prize Technical Excellence for the best props for the event Anno Domini - EuBea; 2009 "1st prize Best Company Event" for Banca Mediolanum, "1st prize Best congress/convention " with "Inauguriamo l'ottimismo" - Bea.

== Trivia ==
He invented the term "Tecnocreativo" (techno creative) defining a new generation of eclectic professionals ready to operate with new technologies while maintaining a great awareness of human nature and a strong focus towards emotions.
