= Fininvest =

Italian holding company

Finanziaria d'investimento Fininvest S.p.A.
- Trade name: Fininvest
- Company type: Private
- Industry: Financial services
- Founded: 21 March 1975; 51 years ago
- Founder: Silvio Berlusconi
- Headquarters: Rome, Italy (legal); Milan, Italy (de facto)
- Key people: Marina Berlusconi (chairwoman); Danilo Pellegrino (CEO)
- Services: Holding company
- Revenue: ▲€3.870.5 billion (2023)
- Net income: ▲€252.9 million (2023)
- Total equity: ▲€4.699 billion(2023)
- Owner: Berlusconi family
- Number of employees: ▲17,223 (2016 Group)
- Subsidiaries: Mondadori (53.299%); MFE - MediaForEurope (50%); Teatro Manzoni (100%); Alba Servizi Aerotrasporti (100%); Fininvest Gestione Servizi (100%); AC Monza (20%)
- Website: www.fininvest.it
- Footnotes / references source; Mediaset was consolidated as Fininvest had the controlling stake in the number of directors in the board.

Finanziaria d'investimento Fininvest S.p.A., also known as Fininvest, is an Italian holding company controlled by the Berlusconi family and managed by Silvio Berlusconi's eldest daughter Marina Berlusconi.

== Structure ==
The Fininvest group is composed of a number of companies, such as Mondadori (one of Italy's leading publishing companies), Teatro Manzoni (a theatre in Milan), Alba Servizi Aerotrasporti (a private jet company) and Fininvest Gestione Servizi.

Fininvest is the largest shareholder of MFE – MediaForEurope, which is currently the biggest private entertainment competitor in Italy, known for domestic operations in Italy through Mediaset (including Canale 5, Italia 1, Rete 4, among others), Spanish operations through Mediaset España, the film production company Medusa Film, and many other companies related to TV broadcasting. The deal to sell Mediaset Premium collapsed in 2016.

Fininvest's voting rights on Mediolanum was capped at 9.9999% by Italian Insurance Supervisory Authority despite owning about 36% share capital of the financial conglomerate; the company reverse merger with subsidiary Banca Mediolanum in 2015. Fininvest had a shareholders' pact with Ennio Doris (the pact only binds to 25.5% share each, the excess amount of shares was not bound), the largest shareholder of Banca Mediolanum, making the pact had an absolute majority in the bank for 51% share capital.

On 5 August 2016, Fininvest signed a preliminary agreement to sell 99.93% stake of AC Milan to a Chinese private equity fund Sino-Europe Sports. The deal was completed on 13 April 2017.

On 15 February 2017, Fininvest announced that they bought an additional 2.9% shares of Mondadori (increased to 53.299%) It was followed by and additional 1.27% shares of Mediaset on 12 May. Fininvest had also purchased more shares in December 2016, in response to hostile takeover by Vivendi.

On 28 September 2018, Fininvest acquired AC Monza. The football club reached Serie A for the first time in 2022, and remained in Italy's top division until 2025. On 1 July 2025, Fininvest sold 80% of its shares in AC Monza to the American investment firm Beckett Layne Ventures, in a deal valued at approximately €45 million, including the club's debts. The remaining 20% stake was scheduled for transfer by June 2026.

== Other investments ==
Fininvest owned 0.99% stake in Mediobanca, and was part of the shareholders' pact that owned about 31% stake in the bank in total.
