= Matthew L. Forister =

- Born: June 19, 1974 (age 52); Ojai, California, U.S.
- Education: University of San Francisco (BA); University of California, Davis (PhD)
- Known for: Research on butterfly population decline and plant–insect coevolution
- Awards: Foundation Professor, University of Nevada, Reno (2020)
- Scientific career
- Fields: Evolutionary ecology, entomology
- Institutions: University of Nevada, Reno
- Doctoral advisor: Arthur M. Shapiro

Matthew L. Forister (born June 19, 1974) is an American evolutionary ecologist and entomologist known for his research on butterflies, plant–insect interactions, and insect population decline. He is a Foundation Professor and the Trevor J. McMinn Endowed Research Professor of Biology at the University of Nevada, Reno.

== Early life and education ==
Forister was born in Ojai, California, and grew up in Roseville, California. He earned a bachelor's degree in English writing from the University of San Francisco, then spent two years as a Peace Corps volunteer in Ukraine before pursuing graduate study in ecology. He completed a PhD in ecology at the University of California, Davis, working under Arthur M. Shapiro on the systematics and ecology of Mitoura hairstreaks and Hesperia skippers. He subsequently held a postdoctoral position at Stony Brook University with Douglas Futuyma, studying the genetics of plant–insect interactions.

== Career ==
Forister joined the University of Nevada, Reno in 2006 as a research assistant professor, moving to the Department of Biology as an assistant professor in 2008 and becoming associate professor in 2013. He was named the Trevor J. McMinn Endowed Research Professor of Biology in 2015 and a University Foundation Professor in 2020. He also serves as Curator of Entomology at the university's Museum of Natural History.

His lab, sometimes known as the Great Basin Bug Lab, studies specialization, diversification, and plant–insect ecology, combining fieldwork in the Great Basin and Sierra Nevada with genomic sequencing. He has continued the long-running butterfly monitoring project established by his graduate advisor Arthur Shapiro across central California, expanding it with citizen-science data from the North American Butterfly Association and iNaturalist.

== Research ==
Forister is a co-author of the 2021 Science study "Fewer butterflies seen by community scientists across the warming and drying landscapes of the American West," which combined expert and community-science datasets from more than 70 sites spanning 11 western states to examine trends in 450 butterfly species. The study found that populations of most species examined were declining, at a rate of 1.6% annually over four decades, a pattern Forister attributed to climate change given how geographically widespread the declines were, particularly in connection with autumn warming.

He was also a co-author of a 2025 national-scale follow-up study in Science, "Rapid butterfly declines across the United States during the 21st century," which analyzed nearly 77,000 surveys and 12.6 million recorded individuals across 554 species from 2000 to 2020 and found a cumulative 22% decline in total butterfly abundance nationwide, with losses concentrated in the southwestern United States. His broader research addresses the evolution of diet breadth in herbivorous insects, host-plant specialization, and the conservation of insect diversity.

== Journal of Lost Species ==
Forister is involved with the Journal of Lost Species, an academic journal launched at the University of Nevada, Reno to document species that are lost, declining, or endangered, including species not observed for a decade or more that may not yet be confirmed extinct. The journal accepts submissions from academics and non-specialists and is intended to improve understanding of how and why extinctions occur.

== Selected works ==
- Dyer, L. A., & Forister, M. L. (eds.) (2015). The Lives of Lepidopterists. Springer.
- Forister, M. L., Halsch, C. A., Nice, C. C., Fordyce, J. A., Dilts, T. E., Oliver, J. C., Prudic, K. L., Shapiro, A. M., Wilson, J. K., & Glassberg, J. (2021). Fewer butterflies seen by community scientists across the warming and drying landscapes of the American West. Science, 371(6533), 1042–1045.
