= Vincenzo Maranghi =

Italian private banker

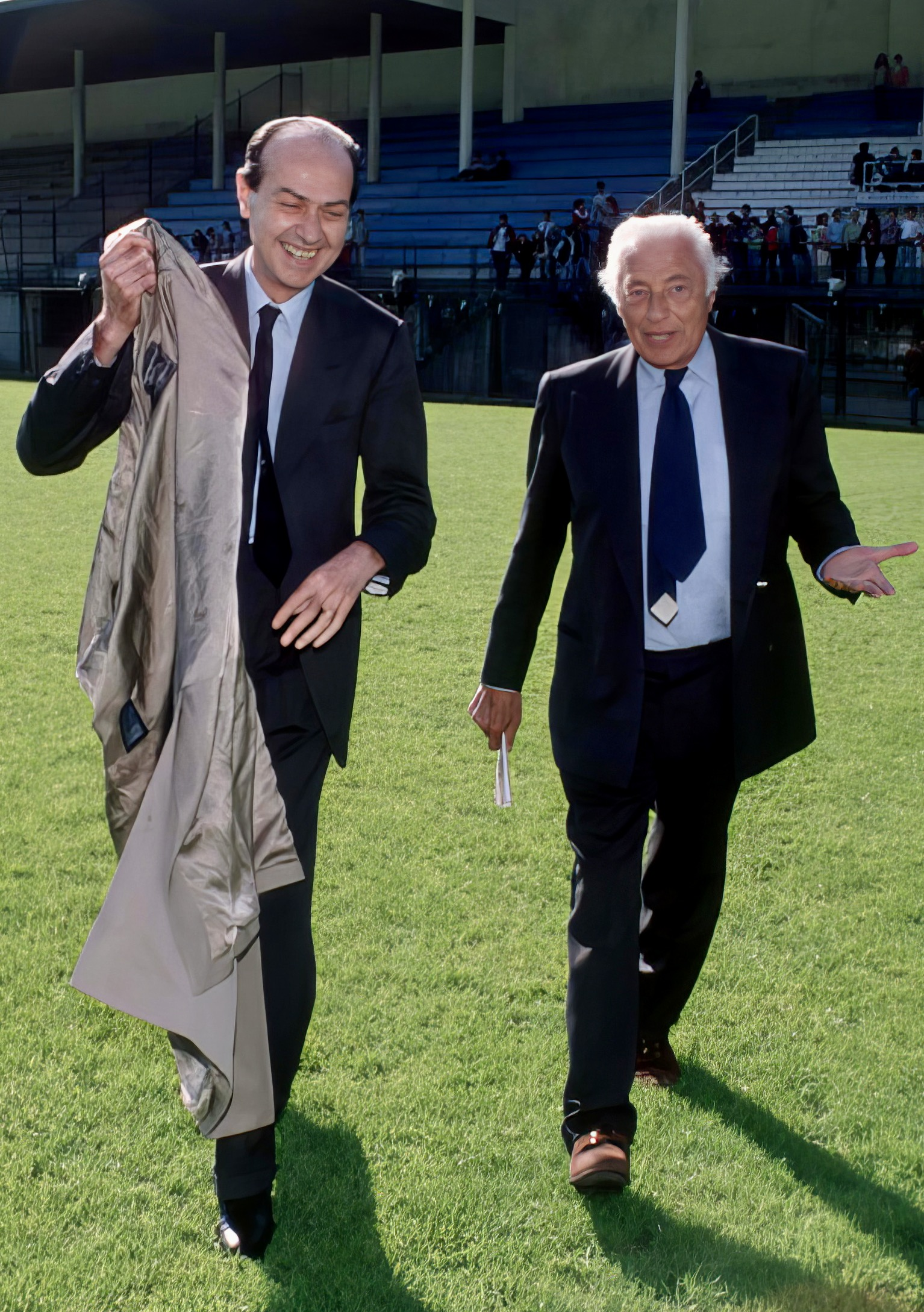
- Maranghi (left) and Gianni Agnelli
- Born: August 3, 1937; Florence, Italy
- Died: July 17, 2007 (aged 69); Milan, Italy
- Education: Piarist Fathers Institute Università Cattolica del Sacro Cuore
- Occupations: Corporate executive, financial magnate
- Years active: 1962-2007
- Known for: CEO and Director of Mediobanca
- Spouse: Anna Castellini Baldissera
- Children: Giuseppe Maranghi, Maurizio Maranghi, Piero Maranghi, Lia Maranghi

Vincenzo Maranghi (August 3, 1937 — July 17, 2007) was an Italian magnate, investment banker, and the CEO of Mediobanca from 2000 to 2003.

== Early life ==
Maranghi completed his secondary education at a high school in Florence operated by the Piarists. He later enrolled in the Faculty of Law at his local university before relocating to Milan. There, he continued his legal studies at the Università Cattolica del Sacro Cuore while working part-time as a journalist for the newspaper Il Sole.

Maranghi married Anna Castellini Baldissera, a member of the prominent Castellini Baldissera family, whose wealth had been built through banking and textile enterprises.

== Career ==
After graduating from law school, Maranghi founded Quattrosoldi, an economics magazine designed to offer practical financial guidance to working-class Italians. He launched the publication in collaboration with Italian print-media magnate Gianni Mazzocchi. He eventually resigned from Il Sole. After his stint in journalism, he was entrusted with overseeing the restructuring and management of the Centre for Economic Studies of Alta Italia. During this time, he worked in the offices of Remo Malinverni, the General Director of one of Italy’s leading think tanks.

Maranghi's career in finance began when he was offered a job at Mediobanca, working under Enrico Cuccia. During his time at Mediobanca Maranghi quickly ascended to the role of Cuccia's most important confidant. Early on he was promoted to central co-director of the bank, eventually becoming the central director for all of Mediobanca's operations two years later. In 1982, after Cuccia's resignation, Maranghi was appointed Director of the Board.

Maranghi took over Silvio Salteri's role as general manager and managing director, ensuring his place as the heir of Mediobanca. Maranghi is accredited for the growth and development of Mediobanca's business consultancy arm, capital markets, and investment portfolios.

When Enrico Cuccia died on June 23, 2000, Maranghi became CEO of Mediobanca. Maranghi's succession was further secured by the firing of younger bankers such as Gerardo Braggiotti and Matteo Arpe, who had conspired to take the position for themselves. In 2002, internal tensions peaked after Mediobanca led the rapid 34% acquisition of Ferrari by Fiat before Unicredit could take the luxury car company public, and the French tandem Bolloré-Bernheim seemed to discreetly make its way into the bank's capital acting as Maranghi's sockpuppets to block Unicredit's ongoing takeover.

Maranghi held his office until April 13, 2003, when he resigned, following a long financial battle due to internal scandals and politics which precipitated inside the highest levels of executive management. This crisis led to a new syndicate agreement and bank governance structure. He renounced any personal benefits that were not already foreseen by his ordinary employment contract. He left the bank in the hands of his two closest confidants, Alberto Nagel and Renato Pagliaro.

== Death ==
Vincenzo Maranghi died of a terminal illness in Milan on July 17, 2007.
