= Esperia (disambiguation) =

Esperia is a municipality in Italy.

Esperia may also refer to:

- Esperia (moth), a genus of the concealer moth family
- Esperia, a synonym of Kirinia, a genus of butterflies
- Banca Esperia, an Italian bank
- Esperia Pony, a breed of pony
- Esperia alpine botanical garden, an alpine botanical garden in Italy

== See also ==
- Hesperia (disambiguation)
- F.C. Esperia Viareggio, an Italian football club, now S.S.D. Viareggio 2014
