= Palazzo del Banco di Sicilia =

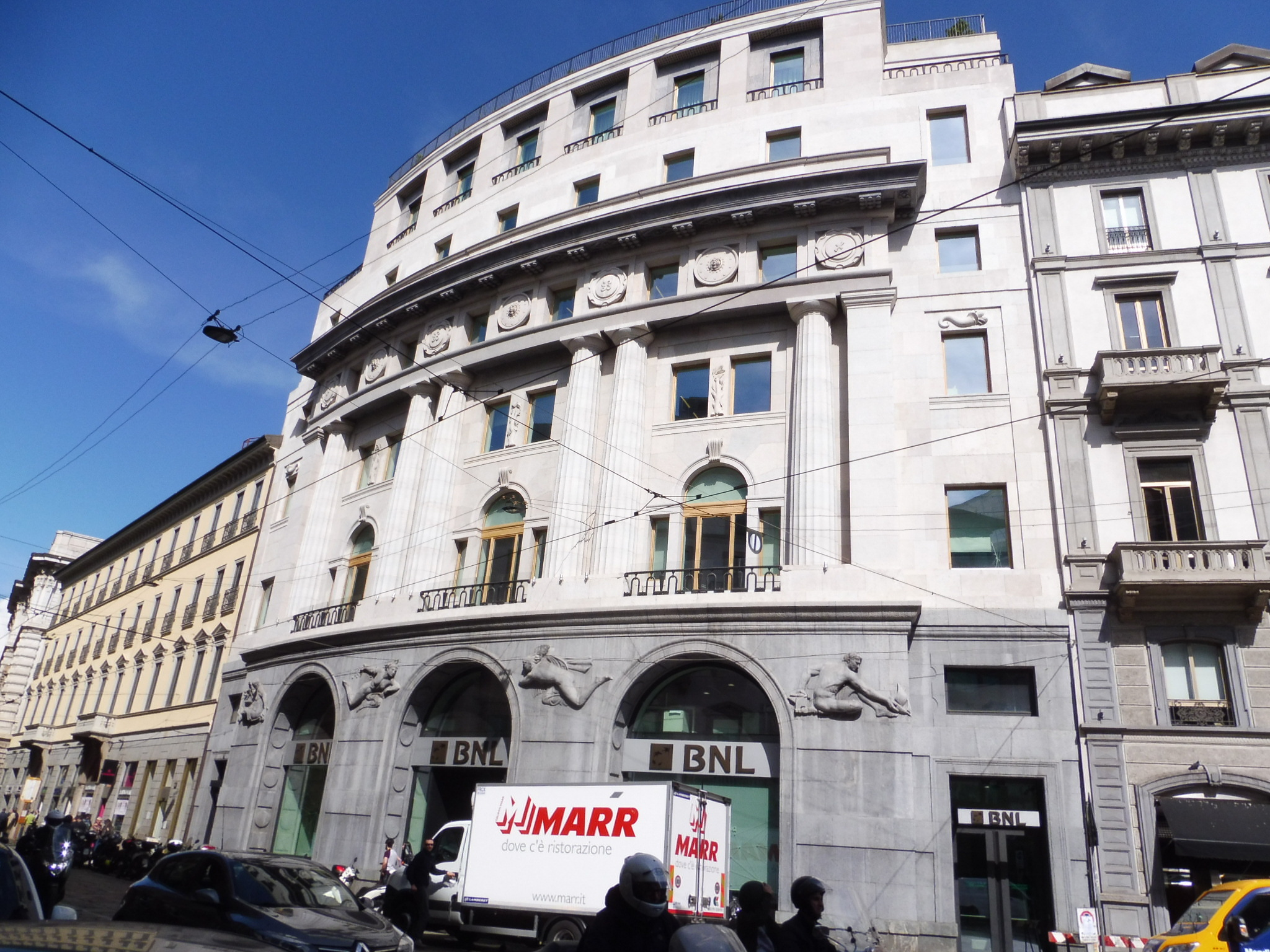
- Palazzo del Banco di Sicilia in 2019
- Click on the map for a fullscreen view

General information
- Location: Milan, Italy
- Coordinates: 45°27′57.86″N 9°11′19.58″E

Palazzo del Banco di Sicilia is a historic building located in Milan, Italy.

== History ==
The building, designed by architect Carlo Polli, was constructed in 1930 after demolishing a pre-existing structure, to serve as the Milan headquarters of Banco di Sicilia. The competition notice, published in 1927, explicitly required an architecture "of a perfectly Italian style," in line with the cultural and political directives of the Fascist era. Polli complied with these guidelines by adopting a classicist language, drawing on forms and proportions from the Italian architectural tradition.

More recently, the property was acquired by a fund managed by Kryalos and later underwent renovation works between 2016 and 2018. In 2019, the building was sold for €102.5 million to a fund subscribed by a club of investors organized by Mediobanca.

== Description ==
The building is located in the centre of Milan on Via Santa Margherita. The main façade, with its curvilinear plan, features a monumental composition inspired by the vocabulary of Greco-Roman architecture.
