= Yegiazaryan v. Smagin =

- Supreme Court of the United States

Argued April 25, 2023 Decided June 22, 2023
- Full case name: Ashot Yegiazaryan, aka Ashot Egiazaryan v. Vitaly Ivanovich Smagin, et al. CMB Monaco, fka Compagnie Monegasque de Banque v. Vitaly Ivanovich Smagin, et al.
- Docket nos.: 22-381; 22-383
- Citations: 599 U.S. 533 (more)
- Argument: Oral argument
- Opinion announcement: Opinion announcement

Questions presented
- 1. Does a foreign plaintiff state a cognizable civil RICO claim when it suffers an injury to intangible property, and if so, under what circumstances.; 2. Whether a foreign plaintiff with no alleged connection to the United States may nevertheless allege a "domestic" injury under RJR Nabisco sufficient to maintain a RICO action based only on injury to intangible property.

Holding
- A plaintiff alleges a domestic injury for purposes of §1964(c) when the circumstances surrounding the injury indicate it arose in the United States.

Court membership
- Chief Justice John Roberts Associate Justices Clarence Thomas · Samuel Alito; Sonia Sotomayor · Elena Kagan; Neil Gorsuch · Brett Kavanaugh; Amy Coney Barrett · Ketanji Brown Jackson

Case opinions
- Majority: Sotomayor, joined by Roberts, Kagan, Kavanaugh, Barrett, Jackson
- Dissent: Alito, joined by Thomas; Gorsuch (Part I)

Laws applied
- Racketeer Influenced and Corrupt Organizations Act

Yegiazaryan v. Smagin, 599 U.S. 533 (2023), was a United States Supreme Court case. The Court decided how the Racketeer Influenced and Corrupt Organizations Act applied to extraterritorial claims of damage to intangible property.

== Prior history ==
In 1970, Congress passed the Racketeer Influenced and Corrupt Organizations Act, commonly known as RICO. Codified at 18 U.S.C. §§ 1961–1968, it provides for extended criminal penalties and a civil cause of action for actions performed as part of an ongoing criminal enterprise. Often, organized criminal enterprises may infiltrate legitimate businesses through what the Act calls "racketeering activity". Racketeering activity includes several state and federal offences (including murder, kidnapping, gambling, etc.), known as "predicates". Predicate offences themselves do not implicate RICO; rather, RICO is triggered by a pattern of such racketeering activity.

Violations of RICO constitute a criminal offence. While the Attorney General is responsible for the Act's enforcement, Congress has also enacted a private civil right of action for any individual harmed by a pattern of racketeering activity.

In RJR Nabisco, Inc. v. European Community, the Supreme Court addressed RICO's extraterritorial reach, applying a presumption against such applications. It found that some, but not all, of RICO's substantive provisions encompass unlawful conduct occurring outside the United States. However, in order to state a private right of action, the Court found that a private RICO plaintiff "must allege and prove a domestic injury".

== Background ==
The opinion of the Supreme Court in Ashot Egiazaryan, v. Smagin, consolidated with CMB Monaco, formerly known as Compagnie Monegasque de Banque, v. Vitaly Ivanovich Smagin et al.

Ashot Yegiazaryan (alternatively spelled, Egiazarian) is a Russian former politician and businessperson. Until 2010, he lived in Russia. After having been accused of fraud by the Russian government, he fled and now resides in California. Vitaly Smagin is a Russian businessman who resides in Russia. In 2003, Yegiazaryan and Smagin partnered on a real-estate project in Moscow. The partnership eventually broke up after disagreement over using this project as a security for a different project in Moscow. In 2010, after the partnership ended, Smagin commenced an arbitration against Yegiazaryan in the London Court of International Arbitration (LCIA) seeking to recoup his investment. In 2014, Smagin was awarded $84 million (hereinafter, the "LCIA award").

Smagin, hoping to collect on this award, focused on the proceeds of a $198 million settlement that Yegiazaryan later obtained in an unrelated arbitration against Russian businessman Suleyman Kerimov (hereinafter, the "Kerimov award"). Smagin moved to have the LCIA award recognized by courts in Liechtenstein (where many of Yegiazaryan's assets were alleged to have been held) and California (where Yegiazaryan lives). In 2016, courts in both jurisdictions recognized Smagin's award.

== Lower court history ==
In 2020, seeking to collect on the LCIA award, Smagin filed a lawsuit in the United States District Court for the Central District of California under RICO's private right of action. Among others, Smagin's complaint implicated Yegiazaryan and CMB Monaco (where Smagin alleged Yegiazaryan had deposited funds). His complaint accused the defendants of inhibiting his collection of the LCIA award through wire fraud, as well as other RICO predicate racketeering acts. Specifically, he accused Yegiazaryan and his codefendants of attempting to conceal the proceeds of the Kerimov award to prevent it from being used to satisfy the LCIA award.

Yegiazaryan and CMB Monaco moved to dismiss Smagin's RICO complaint, arguing that his claims were foreclosed upon by the Supreme Court's decision in RJR Nabisco, which held that a private RICO suit must allege a "domestic", rather than "foreign" injury. As such, they argued that Smagin (who lived in Russia at all relevant times) had not suffered a domestic injury. The District Court agreed, stating that Smagin (as a resident of Russia) would have felt the loss resulting from his inability to collect on his judgment solely in Russia. Despite existing tests in the Third and Seventh Circuits for assessing the location of a private RICO injury, it held that either test would have determined that Smagin's injury was strictly foreign.

On appeal, the United States Court of Appeals for the Ninth Circuit reversed. It first held that judgments (specifically, the 2016 judgment by the California court recognizing the LCIA award) qualify as "intangible property". It then noted a split among the Third and Seventh Circuits regarding the appropriate legal test for determining whether RICO claims involving intangible property result in "domestic" or "foreign" injuries. The latter had adopted a bright-line rule focusing on the plaintiff's residence, while the former had adopted a balancing test. The court decided to apply a balancing test but, unlike the Third Circuit, focused their analysis on the defendant's residence and conduct, rather than the residence of the plaintiff. Since the LCIA award had been confirmed by a California court and Yegiazaryan's alleged misconduct took place in California, the Court reasoned that Smagin had successfully alleged a permissible domestic injury, and that he therefore could seek a civil RICO remedy.

== Supreme Court ==
On October 20, 2022, Yegiazaryan and CMB Monaco filed separate petitions for the Supreme Court to hear their cases. On January 13, 2023, the court granted certiorari in both cases, and subsequently consolidated them. On June 22, 2023, the Supreme Court affirmed the Ninth Circuit in a 6–3 decision.

== See also ==
- RJR Nabisco, Inc. v. European Community
