= Mediolanum (company) =

Former Italian financial company which had a merger in 2015

- Industry: Financial services
- Founded: 1982
- Defunct: 2015
- Fate: reversed merger with Banca Mediolanum
- Headquarters: Basiglio, Italy
- Key people: Ennio Doris
- Services: Retail banking, life insurance, mutual funds
- Net income: ▼€361.454 million (2014)
- AUM: ▲€64.457 billion (2014)
- Total assets: ▲€42.548 billion (2014)
- Total equity: ▲€1.813 billion (2014)
- Website: www.mediolanum.com
- Footnotes / references source

Mediolanum S.p.A. was an Italian financial services company based in Basiglio, in Metropolitan City of Milan, founded by Ennio Doris in 1982. Mediolanum Group was headed by Mediolanum S.p.A., until reversed merger with subsidiary Banca Mediolanum in 2015.

Doris remains the chief executive officer and largest shareholder with around 40% of the company today. The second-largest shareholder with over 36% is Berlusconi's Fininvest. Mediolanum is active in the banking (as Banca Mediolanum and Banco Mediolanum in Spain), life insurance and mutual fund sectors and aims much of its products towards individuals and families. The firm also operates in other European countries, notably Spain where it owns Fibanc.

The company Mediolanum S.p.A. was listed on the Borsa Italiana and was a constituent of the FTSE MIB index until the end of 2015 when it was merged with Banca Mediolanum.
