= Count of Verampio =

Italian peerage

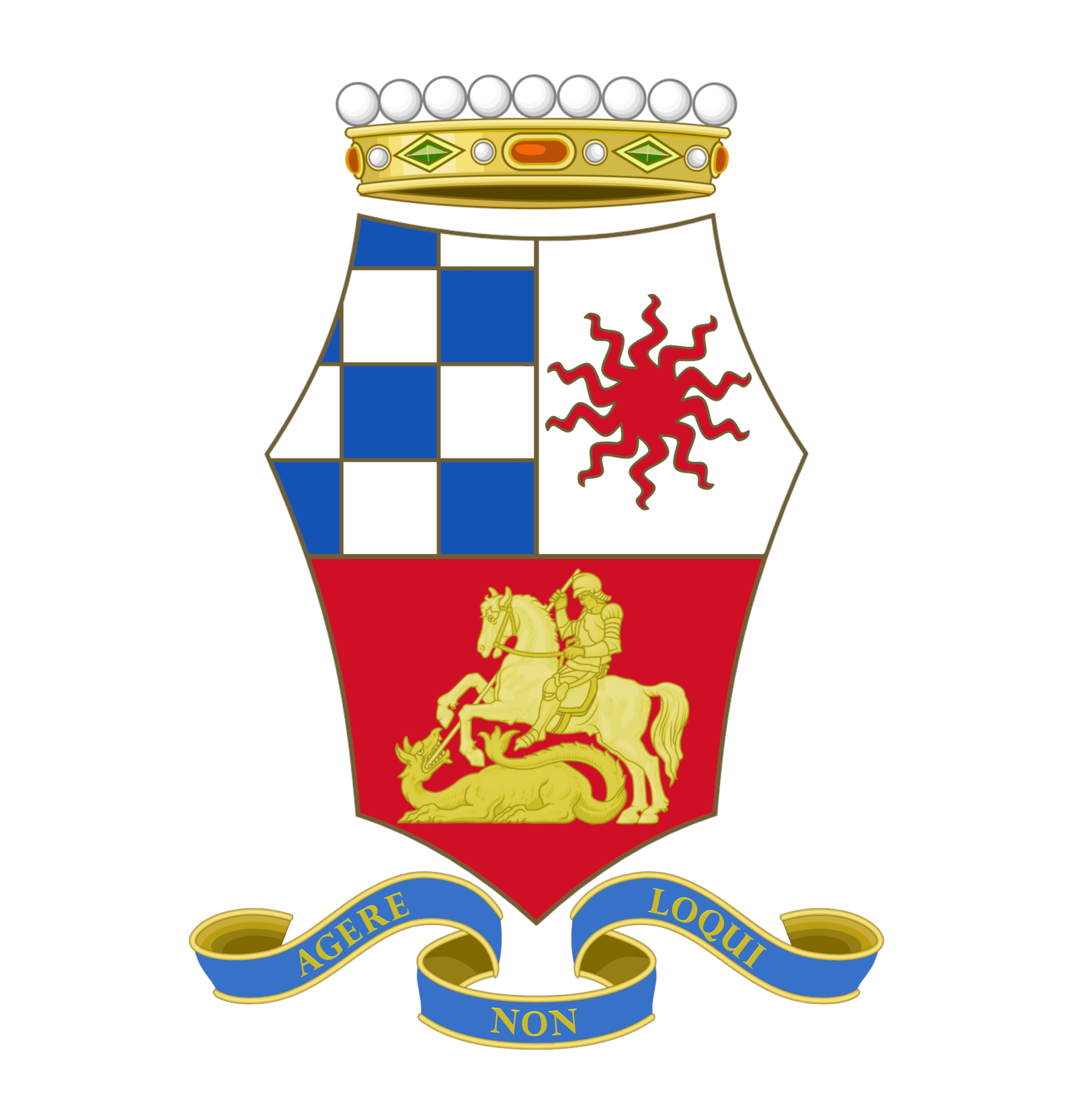
- Creation date: 1938
- Created by: Victor Emmanuel III of Italy
- Peerage: Peerage of Italy
- First holder: Ettore Conti of Verampio, Count of Verampio
- Present holder: None
- Status: Extinct
- Seat: Villa Verampio
- Former seat: Casa degli Atellani
- Motto: "Agere Non Loqui"

The Count of Verampio is a title in the Peerage of Italy. The last remaining heirs related to the title are the Castellini Baldissera family.

== History ==
The title was created in 1938 for Ettore Conti, an Italian industrialist and philanthropist, who founded a number of Italy’s energy companies. Victor Emmanuel III of Italy created the title on the 9th of May 1938, by Royal Decree. The County of Verampio was created in recognition of Conti's numerous contributions to Italy's energy and banking industries, and his role as a prominent public figure and Senator of The Realm.

The title was part of a new series of peerages, which were created to reward the most important Italian magnates under the House of Savoia. Similar titles were created for the likes of Giovanni Caproni (Count of Taliedo), Gabriele d'Annunzio (Prince of Montenevoso) and Pietro Badoglio (Marquis of Sabotino and Duke of Addis Abeba).

The County of Verampio was specifically chosen for Conti's title because the majority of his hydroelectric dams and property holdings were located in the locality's valley. The dams and administrative buildings are widely known for their elegant architectural design, which Conti pioneered with the help of Piero Portaluppi.

Conti's design for his Coat of Arms incorporates the following: party per fess: 1st, chequy argent and azure; 2nd, argent a Visconti Sun gules; 3rd, gules St. George or slaying a dragon or. The motto reads: "Agere Non Loqui" or "Act, do not speak" which Conti's peers often jested was an allusion to his clandestine nature.
