= Castellini Baldissera =

Italian family originating from Milan and Brescia

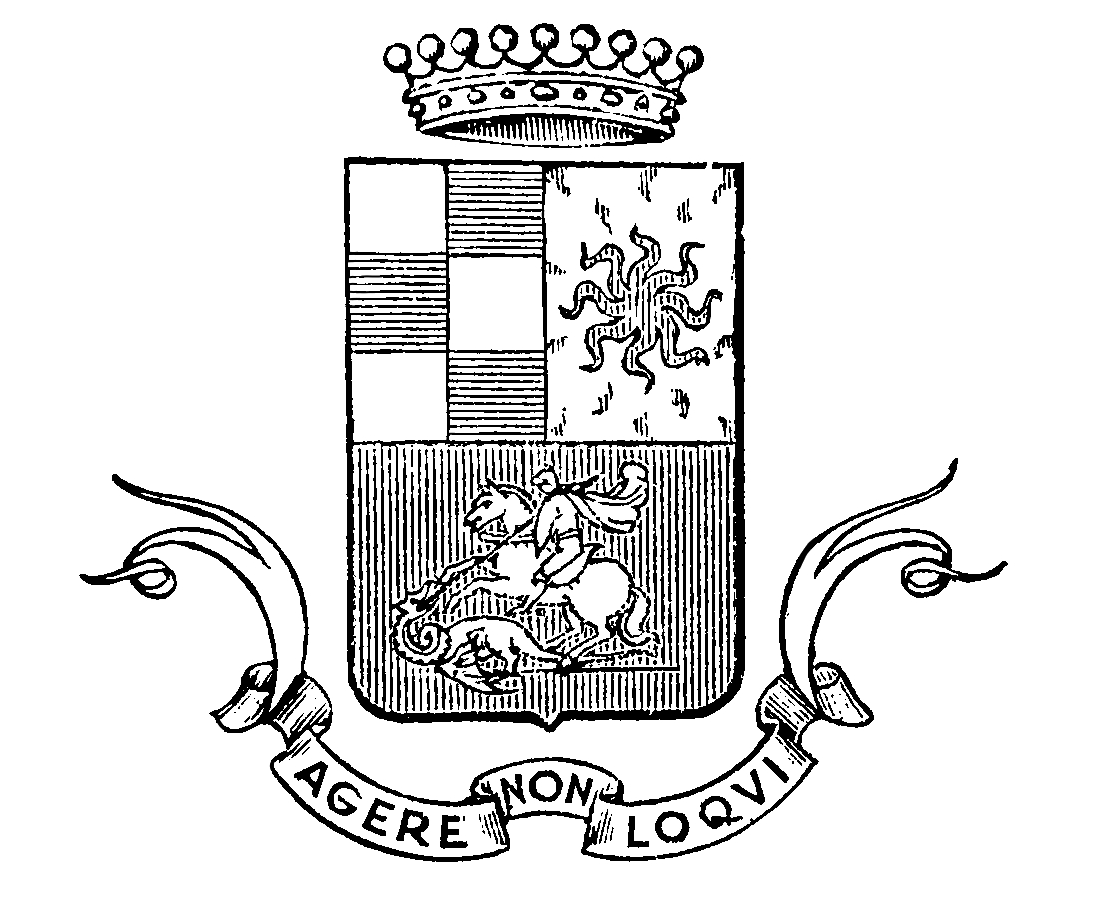
- Country: Kingdom of Italy; Republic of Italy
- Founded: Late 18th century
- Estates: Milan, Cerro

The Castellini Baldissera are a notable family from Milan and Brescia that played a significant role in the unification and industrialization of Italy.

== History ==
The Castellini Baldissera family's ancestral seats are the 18th-century Villa Grande on Lago Maggiore and the 14th-century Casa degli Atellani in Milan. The family is active in banking, real estate, and textile production in Italy; it is also known for having co-owned the Italian subsidiary of Barclays through their private bank: Castellini & Company.

The Castellini family originated as landowners in the early 18th century, living in the foothills around Milan. Around the mid-19th century, the family began to industrialize. Thanks in large part to Italy's vast territories dedicated to the rearing of sheep, they were able to build several mills that produced fine fabrics and textiles. These became very lucrative. As the country's political system shifted, this business model became very popular amongst the Italian upper classes. At the turn of the 20th century Clateo Castellini used his family's wealth, from textile production, ceramics, logging, and other ventures, to found a private and merchant bank.

The family is also recognized in the Equestrian world for their expertise in racing and breeding English Thoroughbreds.

== Notable members of the family ==
Both the Castellini and Baldissera families have historical ties to the Royal Italian Army and Imperial Austrian Army; many family members have occupied senior positions in both.

Nicostrato Castellini was a founding father of the Kingdom of Italy. In 1860 he took part in the campaign to liberate southern Italy, with the second expedition of General Giacomo Medici, in support of the Expedition of the Thousand, distinguishing himself for bravery at the capture of Milazzo, in the Battle of the Volturno, and at Caiazzo, where he was promoted to the rank of Major. In 1862 he followed Garibaldi in the Aspromonte Campaign. He founded a charitable institution for Garibaldian veterans.. Nicostrato Castellini died during the Third Italian War of Independence, in the Battle of Vezza d'Oglio, on July 4, 1866.

He is mentioned in a popular song of the Milanese Scapigliatura:

"Scriveva la surela

del pover Luisin

che l'era mort in guera

de fianc al Castelin"

(The poor Luisin)

His tomb in the Monumental Cemetery of Milan is considered the first of the then newly established cemetery to display a distinctly monumental character.

Antonio Baldissera served as the governor of Italian Eritrea, a role which earned the family some controversy. Baldissera's statue was vandalized by protestors as a response to the murder of George Floyd. As a young man, Baldissera was recommended for service by Maria Anna of Savoy, Empress consort of Austria, beginning his career as a Kaiserjäger.

Ettore Conti of Verampio, another relative, was an Italian aristocrat and energy magnate. Conti oversaw many of Italy's major initiatives to design the nation's modern energy infrastructure. Conti served as a Senator in both the Kingdom and the Republic of Italy; he was also a founding member of AGIP and Edison.

Piero Portaluppi, an architect and real estate mogul, married into the family. He designed and restored Villa Necchi Campiglio, the Museo del Novecento, Milan's Planetarium, the Pinacoteca di Brera, and numerous other buildings of cultural significance around Italy. Portaluppi was chiefly responsible for restoring the Duomo after World War II.

== Other relatives ==
The Castellini Baldissera are closely related to the Medici di Marignano and Visconti di Modrone families. Clateo Castellini married Marchioness Adele Medici of Marignano and Elena Castellini married Count Raimondo Visconti di Modrone. The Castellini are also more distantly related to the Ranieri di Sorbello, Pallavicini, and Casati families.

== In popular culture ==
The Castellini Baldissera family provided inspiration for the 2009 film I Am Love, directed by Luca Guadagnino. Many of the film's main scenes were shot on the family's various properties in Milan, with some members repeatedly appearing in minor roles.
