= Azienda Italiana Petroli Albania =

The Azienda Italiana Petroli Albania (AIPA) was a company created by Italian railways and later controlled by AGIP, active from 1935 to 1943.

== History ==
=== Albanian oil ===
The first oil searches in Albania were started during the First World War by Italian, French and English technicians.

The exploitation concessions were obtained from the Anglo-Persian Oil Company in the Malacastra area, then from Standard Oil of New York and the Franco-Albanais Syndacat in other areas. The Ferrovie dello Stato were the first Italian concessionaires in 1925 (Royal decree of 8 July 1925, No. 1301).

=== The concession of Devoli ===
AIPA was born as a special autonomous managementunder the authority of the Autonomous Administration of the State Railways.

In 1935, AIPA granted a concession of 164,000 hectares along the Devoli river and here, in the Cucciova area, renamed Petrolia, the first active wells took place. An approximately 80 km long oil pipeline was built to bring oil to the port of Vlore. In 1937 it employed about 1,500 Albanian workers, in addition to the Italian leadership.

In 1939, the last year before the war, production reached 200,000 tons.

In 1940 [2], with the RDL 580/40 the passage of the Italian company petroli Albanesi to the general Italian company petroli S.A. takes place. (AGIP).
