= CMB Monaco =

Private bank in Monaco

- Company type: Private
- Industry: Financial services
- Founded: 11 March 1976
- Headquarters: Monte Carlo, Monaco
- Key people: Francesco Grosoli (CEO)
- Parent: Mediobanca
- Website: cmb.mc

CMB Monaco an international private bank based in Monaco. Established in March 1976 by Banca Commerciale Italiana and its partners, CMB is today wholly owned by Mediobanca, an Italian investment bank.

== Background ==
CMB Monaco was founded in 1976 by the Banca Commerciale Italiana and other international partners. Since 1996 when it took over the COMIT branches in Monaco, the bank has increasingly concentrated on private banking and wealth management other than retail banking, moving to a leadership position. CMB is a wholly owned subsidiary of Mediobanca (a joint Italian and Monegasque company), which first acquired equity in 1989, obtained a controlling interest in 2004 and now has 100% of the share capital.

== Business activity ==
Currently, the core business of the group is Private Banking, backed up by certain accessory activities such as tax consultancy, tax planning, current accounts operating with credit cards and user domiciliation, provided at the client's request. CMB has, however, continued to provide banking services for private clients, industrial groups and Monegasque institutions, with the goal of strengthening its local presence. Compagnie Monégasque de Banque offers both individual wealth management and normal investment trusts governed by Monegasque law and managed by its specialist company, the Compagnie Monégasque de Gestion. In partnership with Banca Esperia, CMG manages Monaco Hedge Selection, a fund of euro denominated hedge funds. In 2006 it set up CMB Monaco Real Estate Limited Fund, a Jersey-based trust fund that invests in residential property in the Principality of Monaco.

Currently CMB has bank deposits and savings of 7.5 billion euros and a market share of 11%, in line with that of Crédit Foncier in France. It also works in client financing in collaboration with the government of Monaco, for which it has acted as lead manager of financing consortium for certain infrastructural projects and with local companies such as Monaco Telecom (MT), which CMB owns 6% share. It also offers Lombard credits and real estate loans in support of its private banking activity. The CMB group includes several companies in addition to the holding company and in particular a fund management company (CMG), three real estate companies that own properties occupied by the holding company, and the CMB subsidiaries in the Principality. The company employs 190 people. CMB has been granted the reward "Best Local Private Bank in Monaco 2014" by the financial magazine Euromoney.
