= Francesco Grosoli =

Italian businessman

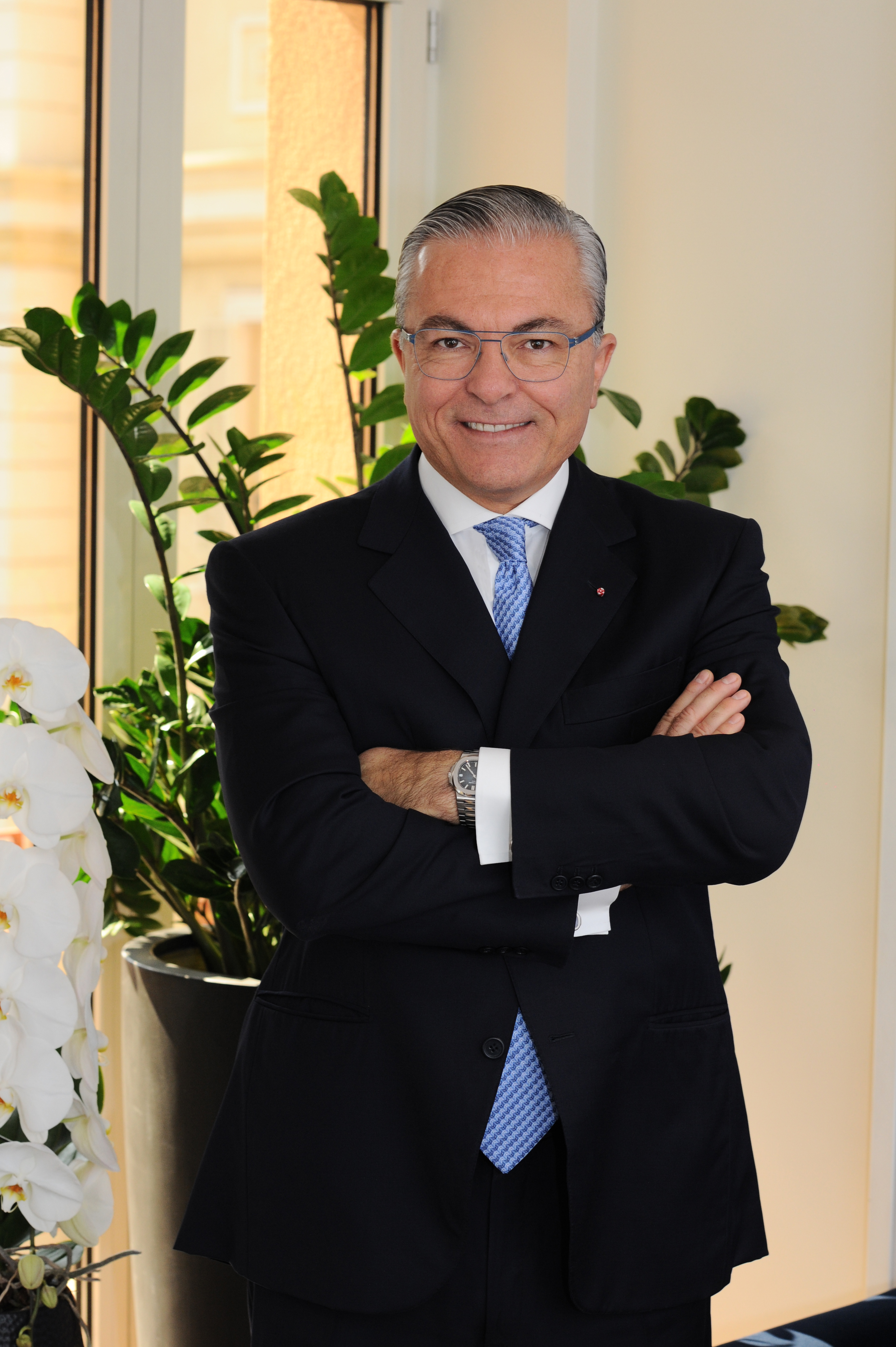
- Education: University of Nice
- Occupation: Businessman
- Title: CEO of CMB Monaco
- Term: 2019 - present

Francesco Grosoli is an Italian businessman, and the CEO of CMB Monaco since 2019. He has been living in the Principality of Monaco since 1975.

== Career ==
After studying Economics at the University of Nice, in 1989 he was hired at the Monegasque branch of the BSI - Banca della Svizzera Italiana.

In 1997 he was hired at the Republic National Bank of New York (later to become HSBC) where he covered various roles until he became responsible for Private Banking. In 2007 he joined the Barclays group as CEO of Barclays Monaco and in 2015 he was then appointed CEO Wealth & Investment Management Europe; in 2016 he became CEO Private Bank EMEA. In 2019 he was appointed CEO of CMB Monaco and his management immediately focused on the renewal and internationalization of the bank.

== Other activities ==
From 2009 to 2019, Grosoli has been member of the Board of Directors of AMAF (Association Monégasque des Activités Financières); in 2021, he was appointed member of the Conseil Économique, Social et Environnemental (CESE). Grosoli has been promoted at the grade of Officer of the Order of Saint-Charles in November 2021.

== Honours ==
- Italy: Knight of the Order of the Star of Italy (4 September 2014)
- Monaco: Officer of the Order of Saint-Charles (17 November 2021)
