= Agip =

Italian automotive gasoline retailer

Agip S.p.A.

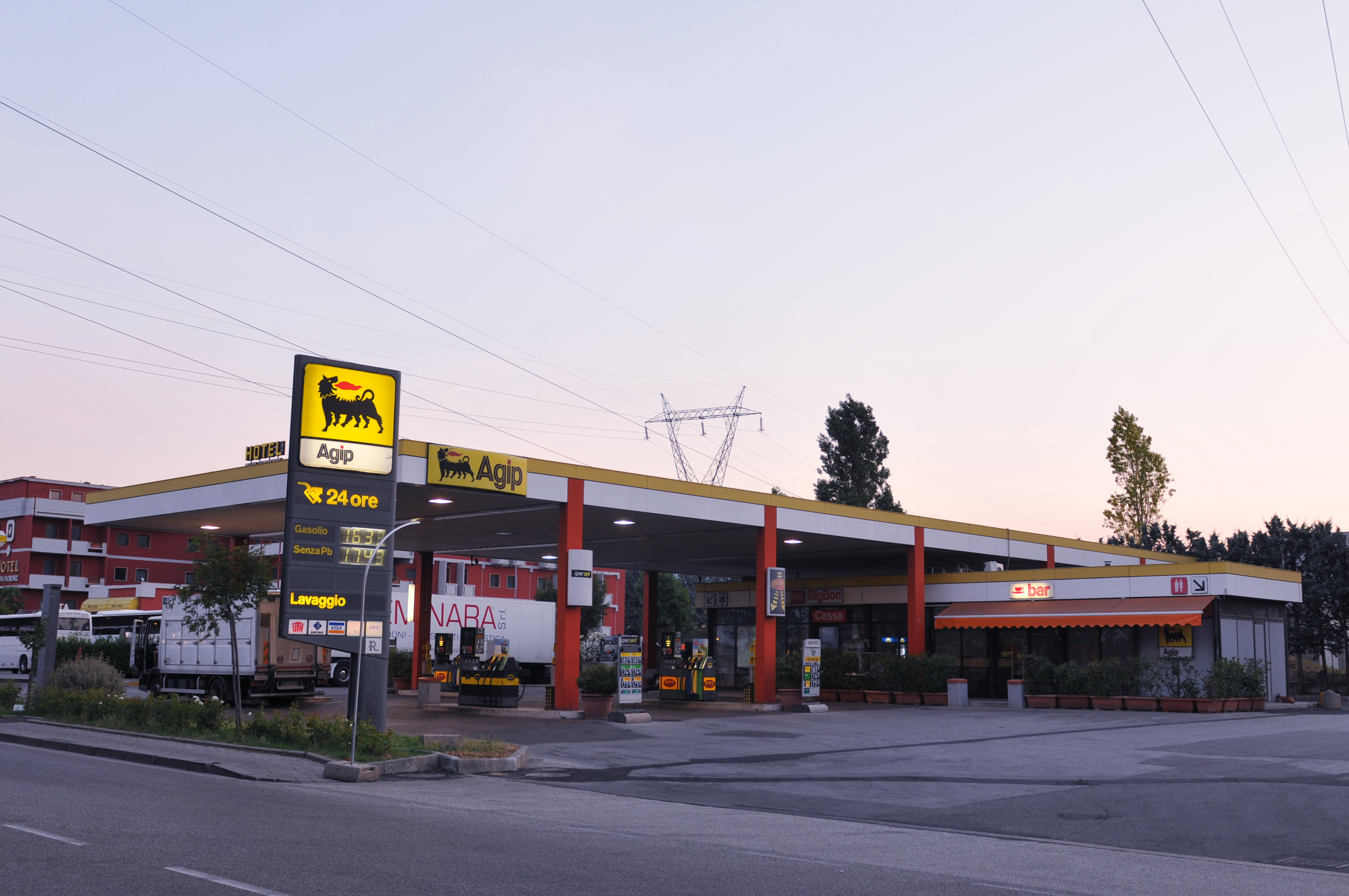
- Agip filling station in Florence, Italy
- Type: Subsidiary
- Industry: Petroleum
- Founded: April 3, 1926; 100 years ago
- Founders: Mussolini Cabinet
- Defunct: 2013
- Fate: Disposal of the brand in favor of Eni
- Successor: Eni Station
- Headquarters: Rome, Italy
- Area served: Italy
- Products: Petroleum
- Owner: Eni (100%)
- Parent: Eni
- Subsidiaries: AgipGas (100%)
- Website: www.eni.com

Agip S.p.A., acronym for Azienda generale italiana petroli, was an Italian automotive gasoline, diesel, LPG, lubricants, fuel oil, and bitumen retailer established in 1926 and subsidiary of Eni S.p.A. since 1953.

In 2013 Agip merged into Eni, creating the Refining and Marketing Division (R&M).

== History ==
In 1924, Sinclair Oil, a U.S. oil company, and the Italian Ministry of National Economy created a fifty-year joint venture agreement to explore oil in Emilia-Romagna and Sicily, over an area of 40,000 km^{2}. 40% of the capital was held by the ministry, all expenditure was incurred by Sinclair Oil and 25% of profits went to the Italian ministry. The political opposition, headed by Giacomo Matteotti and Don Sturzo, alleged that the joint venture was damaging to the nation and started a controversy which led to suspicions of corruption; Matteotti indeed was killed two days before he was due to give a speech on this issue. Don Sturzo continued the controversy, stating that a public company was the only way to maintain national energy independence.

Coal in Italy was scarce and of poor quality. It was imported from abroad at prices that weighed on Italy’s trade balance and limited industrial growth. Power plants, which were not very developed and mainly concentrated in the north of the country, could not satisfy the needs of energy.

=== The constitution of the company and the ad aziendam laws ===
With a royal decree on April 3, 1926, the government of the Kingdom of Italy established the Azienda generale italiana petroli (Agip), a joint-stock company, to conduct all activities relating to the petroleum industry. 60 percent of the share capital was held by the Ministry of the Treasury, 20% by Istituto Nazionale Assicurazioni (INA), and the remaining 20% by the Italian Social Insurance fund. The first president was Ettore Conti, a contractor in the electricity sector. The establishment of the company was attributed by many analysts to Giuseppe Volpi di Misurata, Ministry of Finance, and Giuseppe Belluzzo, Ministry for the National Economy. Volpi di Misurata, however, was directly involved in oil-related interests, working together with FIAT of Giovanni Agnelli, and with the financial backing of Banca Commerciale Italiana, which had searched unsuccessfully for oil in Emilia-Romagna. In 1927 a Mining Act was enacted, which gave the ownership of the subsoil to the State and imposed the rule that any oil-related activity was subject to government authorization and/or grant.

Agip experienced difficulties after the crisis of 1929 but began to flourish in the 1930s. In 1933 a new law was issued that restrained protectionist refineries and Agip could operate with greater ease in this area.

=== Early stages and development ===
Agip had a facility for refining at Fiume and in 1936 it took over a refinery at Porto Marghera, owned by Volpi di Misurata. Soon after it made an agreement with Montecatini to create a joint enterprise, Anic (Fuel Hydrogenation National Company), which was to pursue the derivation of fuel by hydrogenation of brown coal. Anic built two refineries to process the oil extracted in Albania from Azienda Italiana Petroli Albanesi (AIPA), a subsidiary of Agip. However, the Albanian oil was of poor quality and its processing proved uneconomical.

Simultaneously, however, because of the costs to support colonial campaigns, Agip had to exit some foreign investments, in particular their exploration campaigns in Iraq. It was the explorer Ardito Desio who found oil in Libya and in 1939 came the so-called "Petrolibia operation", in which Agip was linked to FIAT, with which the year before it had created an Italian company for synthetic fuels, to explore the possibility of obtaining gasoline from synthetic chemistry.

== Gallery ==
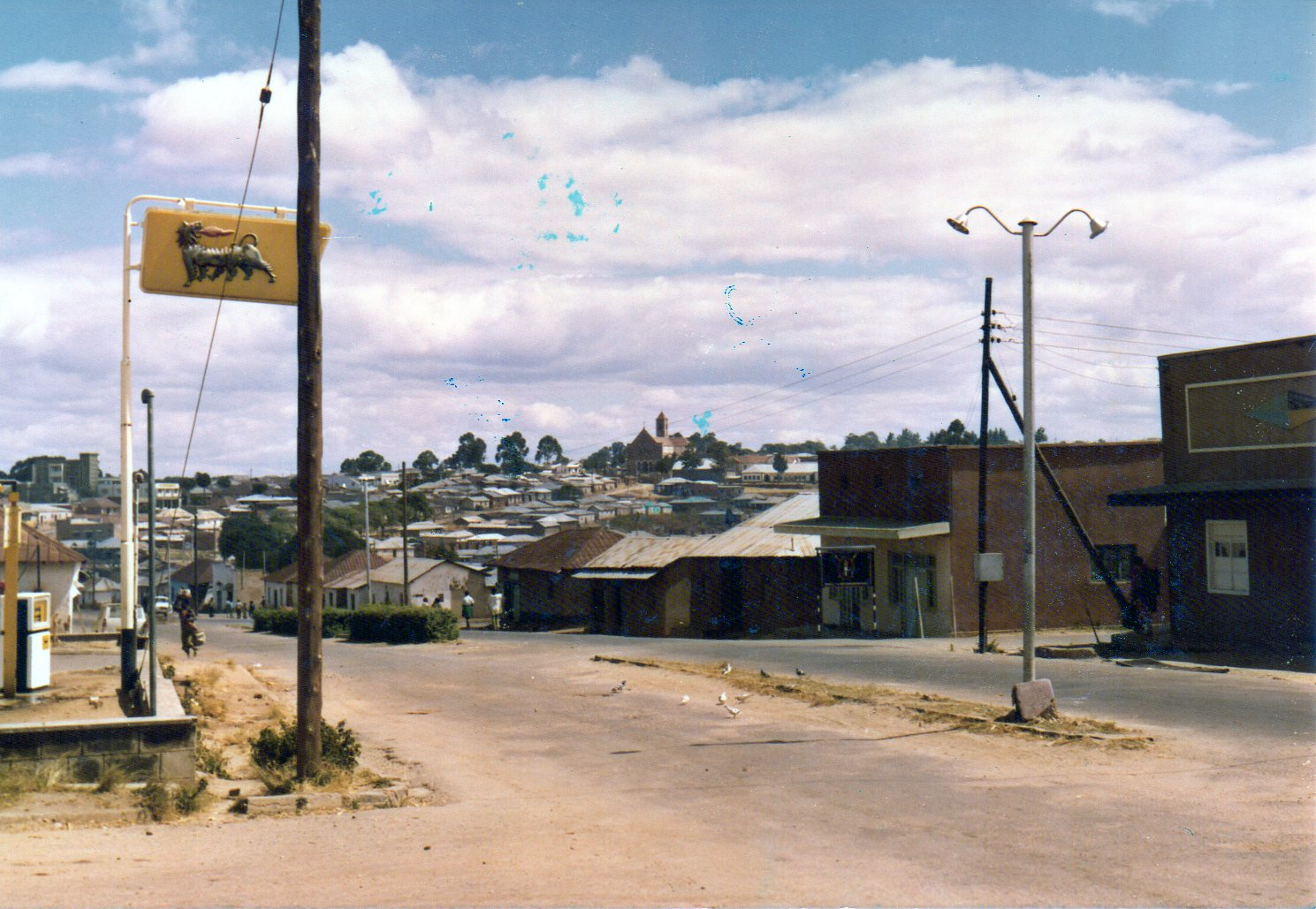
Iringa, Tanzania, 1970s

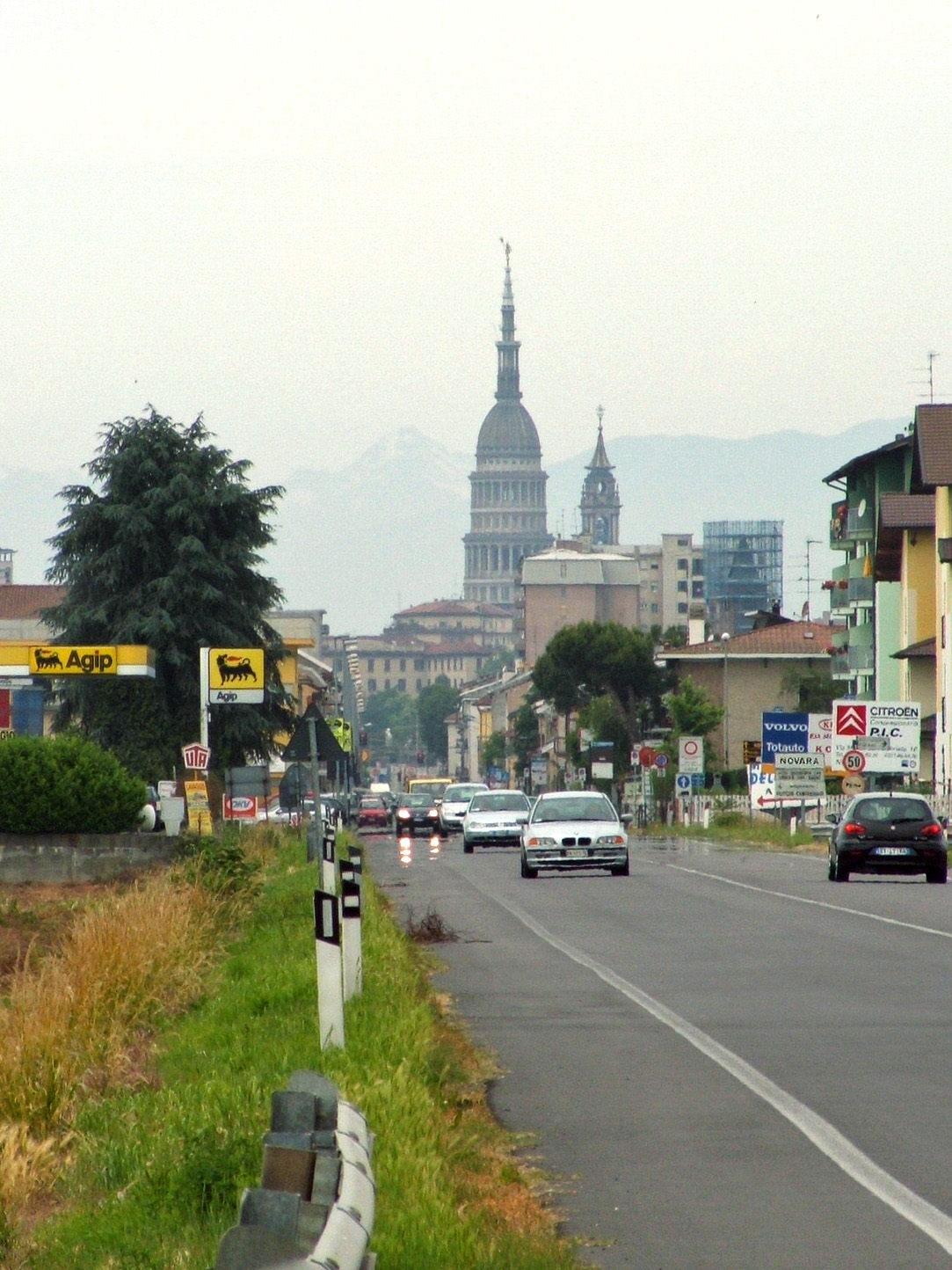
Novara

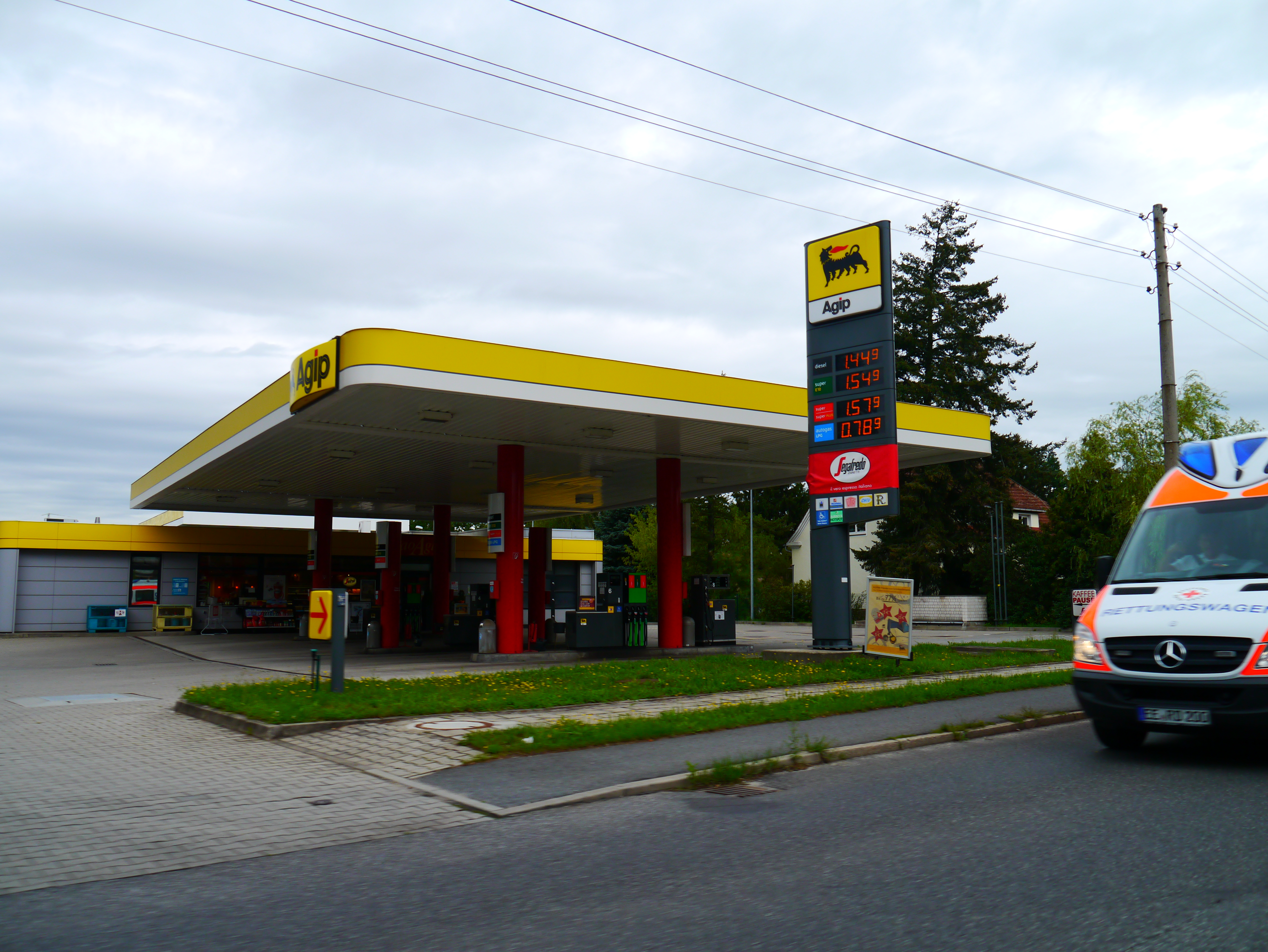
Brandenburg

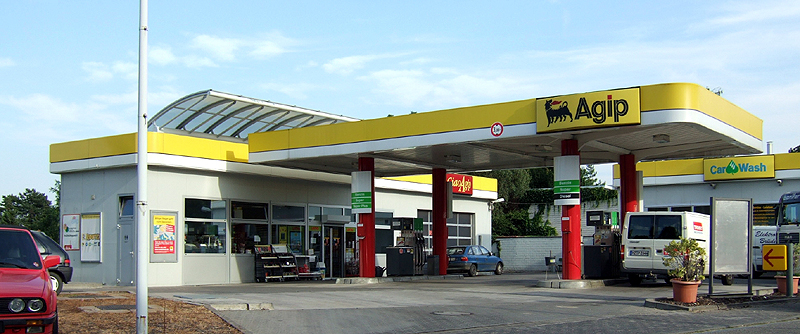
Italy

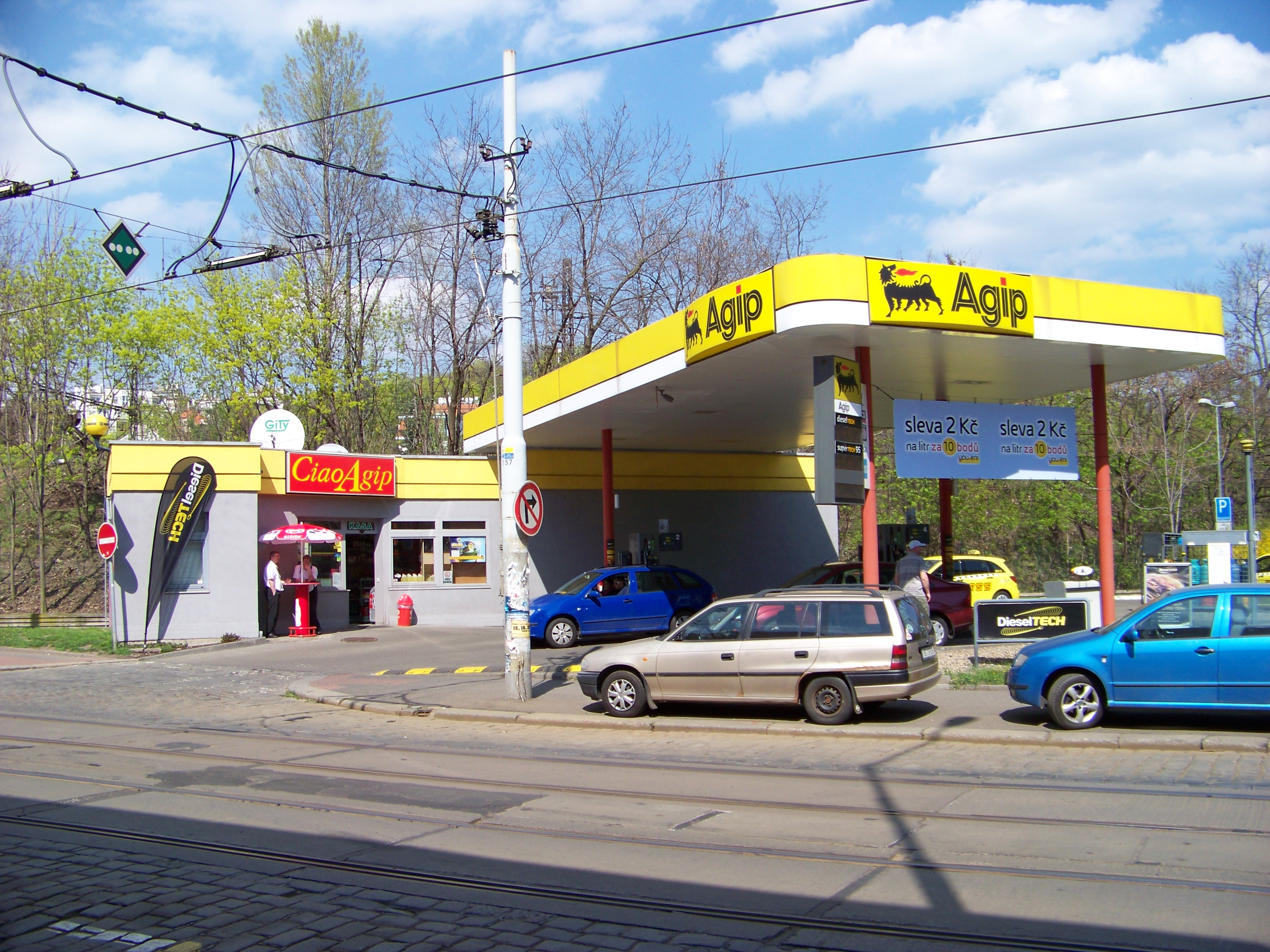
Czech Republic

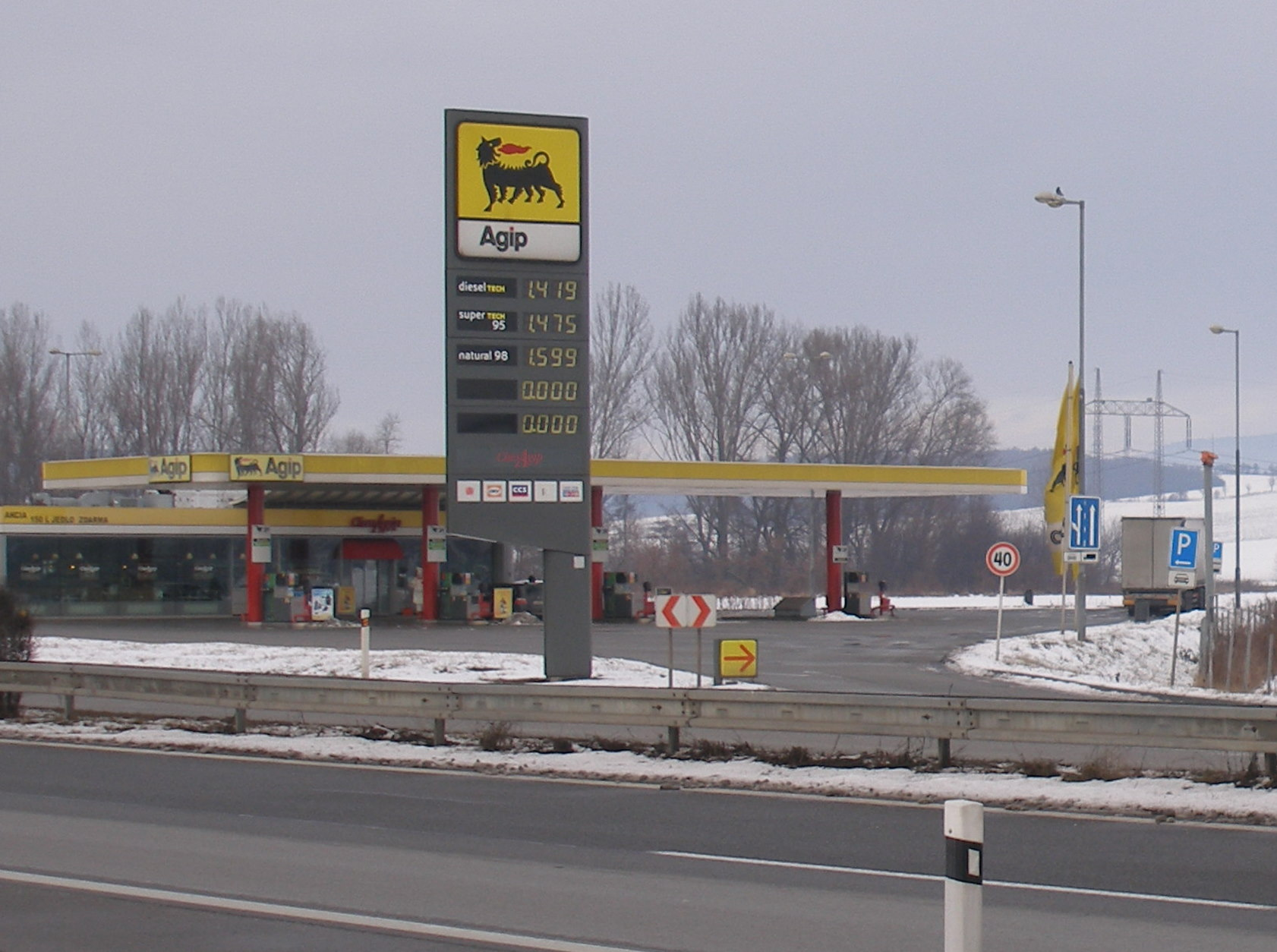
Slovakia

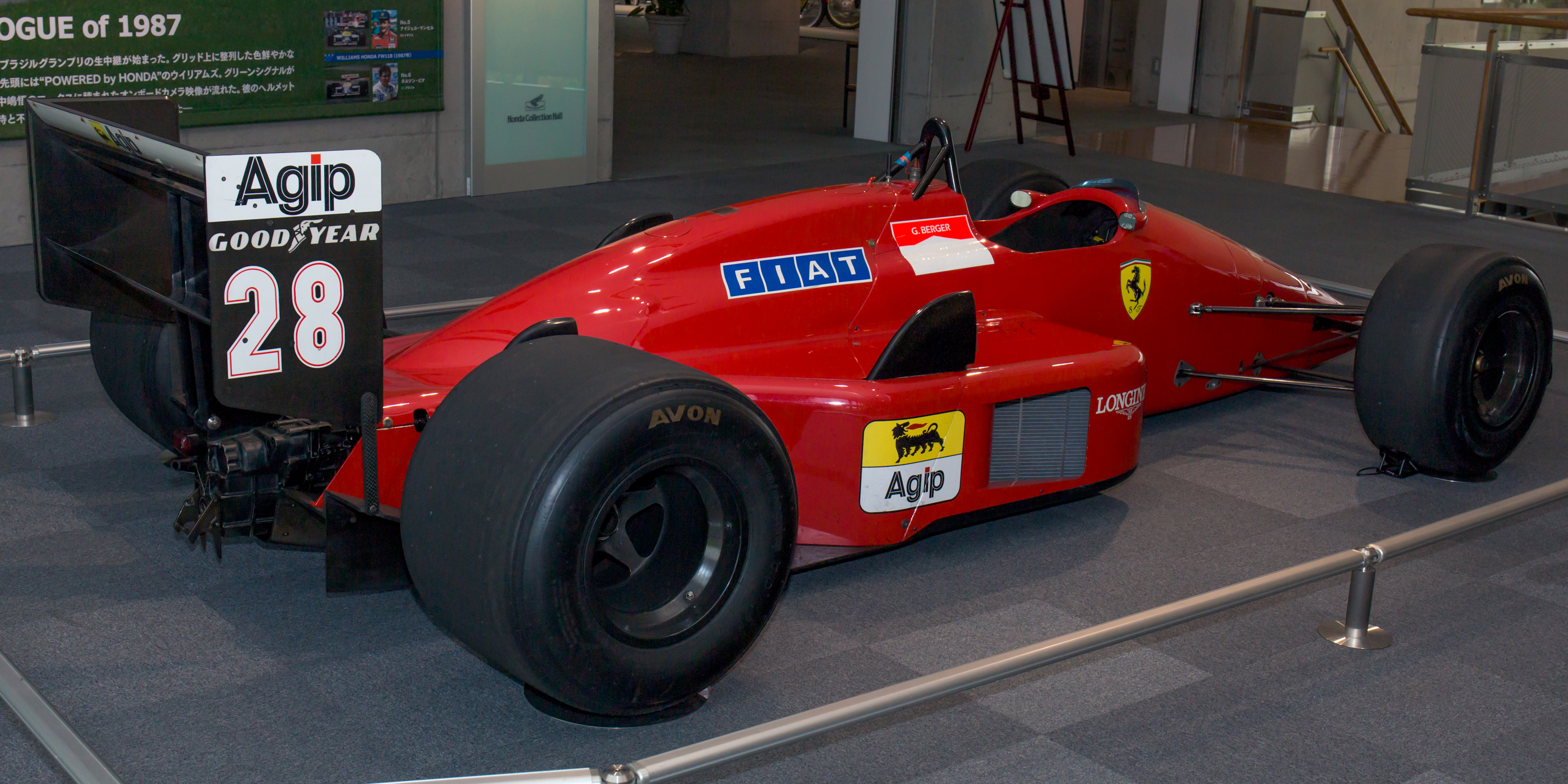
Agip was a long-standing partner of Italian motorsports. Depicted here is a Ferrari F1/87 with their logo.

== See also ==
- Eni
