= Arthur Shapiro (ecologist) =

American ecologist and entomologist (born 1946)

Arthur M. Shapiro (born January 6, 1946) is an American ecologist and entomologist, currently serving as professor emeritus of evolution and ecology at the University of California, Davis. He graduated with an AB in biology from University of Pennsylvania and completed his PhD in Entomology at Cornell in 1970.
