= Ettore Conti, Count of Verampio =

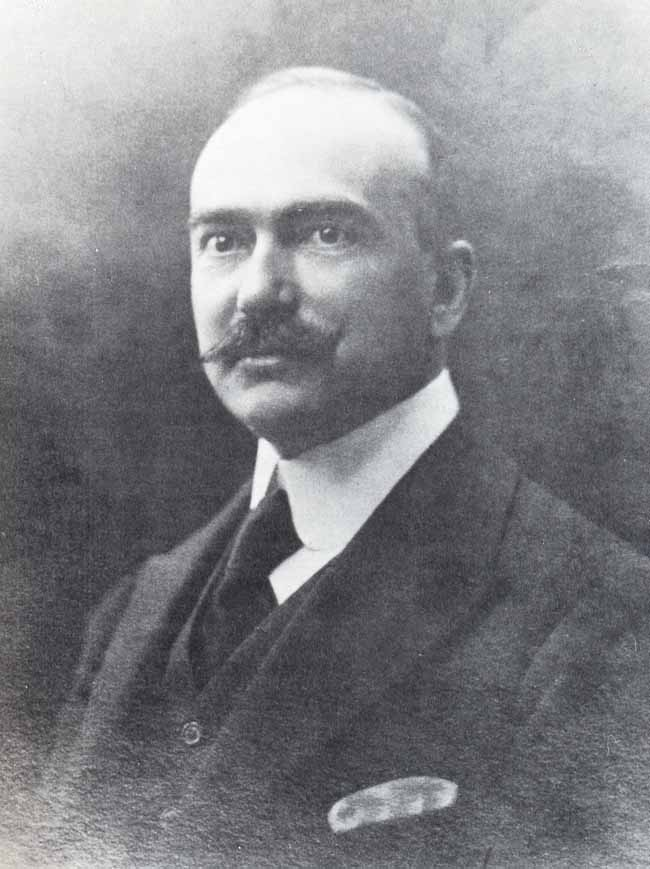
- Born: 1871; Milan, Kingdom of Italy
- Died: 1972 (aged 100–101); Milan, Republic of Italy
- Education: Polytechnic University of Milan
- Occupations: Industrialist, Aristocrat, Senator
- Known for: President of Agip, President of Confindustria
- Spouse(s): Giovanna Casati, dei Conti Casati di Spino e Nosadello

Ettore Conti, Count of Verampio OML, OMRI, OCI (1871–1972, Milan, Kingdom of Italy) was an Italian senator, industrialist, and aristocrat.

== Biography ==
Ettore Conti was born on 24 April 1871, in Milan, the son of Carlo Conti and Giuseppina Palazzoli.

He taught Construction Sciences at the Polytechnic University of Milan, and dedicated himself to the development of Italy's growing electrical industry. In 1901 Ettore Conti founded the Conti & Co Electrical Company, the first in Italy to carry out the large-scale transport of electricity to households across the country, it did so using large waterfalls and water basins.

From 1918 to 1919 he served as the Undersecretary for the Liquidation of Weapons and Munitions at the Ministry of the Treasury. In 1919 Conti became a Conservative Party Senator appointed by Vittorio Emanuele III. He also presided over the Italian Caucasus Campaign, and he was also a key participant in the Genoa Conference.

Conti directed Confindustria, an industrial association between the renowned oil and energy companies, Agip and Châtillon.

Conti retired from his position as owner of the Conti Electricity Company and became the president of the newly formed Agip (Italian National Gas Company), a position he left after only two years, citing the numerous corporate positions assumed in the interest of the BCI (Banca Commerciale Italiana) as the reason for his departure. Conti was given a knighthood in 1931 in recognition of his industrial achievements for the Kingdom of Italy.

== Involvement in Fascism ==
Conti joined the National Fascist Party in 1932 and roughly adhered to the political purposes of the regime, he was also deeply critical of the regime’s adherence to some important economic policy choices. Due to his friendship with Benito Mussolini, Conti was one of the few to criticize the dictator without fear of punishment or death. Conti enjoyed particular consideration from the Duce, so much so that in 1928 Mussolini asked Conti to accompany his daughter Edda Mussolini during the 11th cruise of the Italian Naval League in India, in the hopes that his wife, Countess Casati, would help prepare his daughter for polite society.

Conti also held meetings and informal talks with Hermann Göring, in Berlin, at the International Chamber of Commerce Conference. Like many prominent Italian industrialists, he reluctantly maintained ties with several German leaders throughout the war.

In 1938, Conti was made the Extraordinary Ambassador of the Italian Economic Mission in Japan and Manchukuo, this was done to build commercial relationships with Italy's new Asian allies. On the date of his inauguration, Conti signed the treaties of alliance alongside the Italian Ambassador Giacinto Auriti (1883–1969) and the Japanese General Kazushige Ugaki. On the 9th of May 1938, he was created Count of Verampio by Royal Decree of King Victor Emmanuel III of Italy. The County of Verampio was created in recognition of Conti's numerous contributions to Italy's energy and banking industries, and his role as a prominent public figure and Senator of The Realm.

In 1945, Conti was found innocent of having committed any war crimes and was later made president of the Rotary Club of Italy for his life achievements and philanthropy.

== Death ==
The Count of Verampio died as a result of natural causes on 13 December 1972, in Milan at his home, the Casa degli Atellani.

== Titles, styles, and arms ==
Conti was appointed a hereditary peer of the Kingdom of Italy in 1938, with the title of Count, and became entitled to the style of His Excellency. He was also made a Knight of the Order of Merit for Labour and a Grand Officer of the Order of the Crown of Italy.

Coat of arms of Ettore Conti di Verampio
Coat of arms of Ettore Conti di Verampio	Crest The coronet of an Italian Count. Escutcheon Party per fess: 1st, chequy argent and azure; 2nd, argent a Visconti Sun gules; 3rd, gules St. George or slaying a dragon or. Motto Agere Non Loqui (Act, do not speak)

== Honours ==
- Grand Officer of the Order of the Crown of Italy

- Knight of The Order of Merit for Labour

- Grand Officer of the Order of Merit of the Italian Republic
