= Hesperia =

Hesperia or Hesperian may refer to:

== Geology ==
- The Hesperian, a geologic system and time period on the planet Mars
- Hesperian Massif, the pre-Mesozoic core of the Iberian Peninsula in western Europe

== Literature ==
- Hesperia (journal), an academic journal of Classical archaeology
- Hesperia (mythology), various people and places in Greek mythology
- Hesperia (poem), 1867 book-length verse epic by Richard Henry Wilde

== Places ==
- Hesperia, ancient name for both the Iberian and the Italian Peninsula, used by both the Greeks and the Romans

=== United States ===
- Hesperia, California, a city in the United States
- Hesperia, Iowa, a former name for Burnside, Iowa, an unincorporated community in the United States
- Hesperia, Michigan, a village in the United States

=== Space ===
- 69 Hesperia, an asteroid
- Hesperia Planum, a region of Mars

== Organisations ==
- Hesperia Hotels, Spanish hotel chain owned by NH Hoteles group
- Hesperian College, former name of Chapman University, Orange, California, U.S.
- Hesperian Health Guides, an American NGO
- Hesperian Press, an Australian publisher based in Perth

== Other uses ==
- Hesperia (actress) (1885–1959), Italian actress
- Hesperia (butterfly), a genus in the skipper family, Hesperiidae
- Hesperian, part of the common name for many species of snails in the genus Vespericola, such as the Santa Cruz hesperian
- USS Hesperia (AKS-13), a general stores issue ship
- RMS Hesperian, a British ocean liner sunk during WWI

== See also ==
- The Hesperian Harp, a shape note tunebook published in 1848
- Hesperides (disambiguation)
