= Hesperides (disambiguation) =

Hesperides are nymphs who tend a blissful garden in a far western corner of the world in Greek mythology.

Hesperides may also refer to:

- Hesperides, Libya
- Hesperides (poetry), a collection of poetry written by Robert Herrick
- BIO Hesperides, a Spanish polar research vessel

== See also ==
- Hesperides Hill
