= Banca Mediolanum =

Italian bank, insurance and asset management conglomerate

- Native name: Banca Mediolanum S.p.A.
- Formerly: Programma Italia Investimenti SIM
- Type: public
- Traded as: BIT: BMED; FTSE MIB Component
- Industry: Financial services
- Founded: 1991; 1997 (Banca Mediolanum)
- Headquarters: Basiglio, Metropolitan City of Milan, Italy
- Key people: Ennio Doris (Chairman); Massimo Antonio Doris (CEO)
- Services: Retail banking, life and non-life insurance, mutual funds
- Net income: ▼€249.8 million (3Q 2020)
- Total assets: ▲€155.8 billion (Q4 2025)
- Total equity: ▲€2.070 billion (2015)
- Owner: Doris family (40.22%), Fininvest (30.03%)
- Subsidiaries: Mediolanum Vita; Mediolanum Assicurazioni; Mediolanum Gestione Fondi SGR; Mediolanum Comunicazione; Mediolanum Fiduciaria; Fermi & Galeno Real Estate; Bankhaus August Lenz & Co.; Banca Esperia (50% JV)
- Capital ratio: 19.66% (CET1)
- Website: bancamediolanum.it

Banca Mediolanum S.p.A. is an Italian bank, insurance and asset management conglomerate which is the parent company of Gruppo Mediolanum (Mediolanum Group). The CEO of the company is Massimo Antonio Doris, and the bank is listed on the Borsa Italiana and is a constituent of the FTSE MIB index from the end of 2015 when it incorporated its parent company Mediolanum S.p.A. Mediolanum Group was founded by Ennio Doris, the current second largest shareholders of the conglomerate. The conglomerate provided asset management, banking, and insurance services to customers in Italy, Spain (as Banco Mediolanum and Fibanc) and Germany (Bankhaus August Lenz & Co.).

Despite being ranked sixth by market capitalization among financial services companies (behind Intesa Sanpaolo, UniCredit, Assicurazioni Generali, UnipolSai and Mediobanca in 2016), the conglomerate (Mediolanum S.p.A.) was ranked 13th by total assets among bank (2014 data), as well as much smaller in size by risk-weighed assets, thus the conglomerate (Mediolanum S.p.A nor Banca Mediolanum) was not designated as a "significant institution" under European Banking Supervision. However, after Banca Mediolanum reversed the merger with Mediolanum, the European Central Bank started a comprehensive assessment to assess the conglomerate and decided the conglomerate would not be included. Eventually, Banca Mediolanum has been designated in 2021 as a Significant Institution under the criteria of European Banking Supervision, and as a consequence is directly supervised by the European Central Bank.

In June 2025, Banca Mediolanum sold its entire 3.5% stake in Mediobanca, raising up to €548 million.

== See also ==
- List of banks in the euro area
- List of banks in Italy
