= Basiglio =

Basiglio Basej (Lombard)
- Comune
- Comune di Basiglio
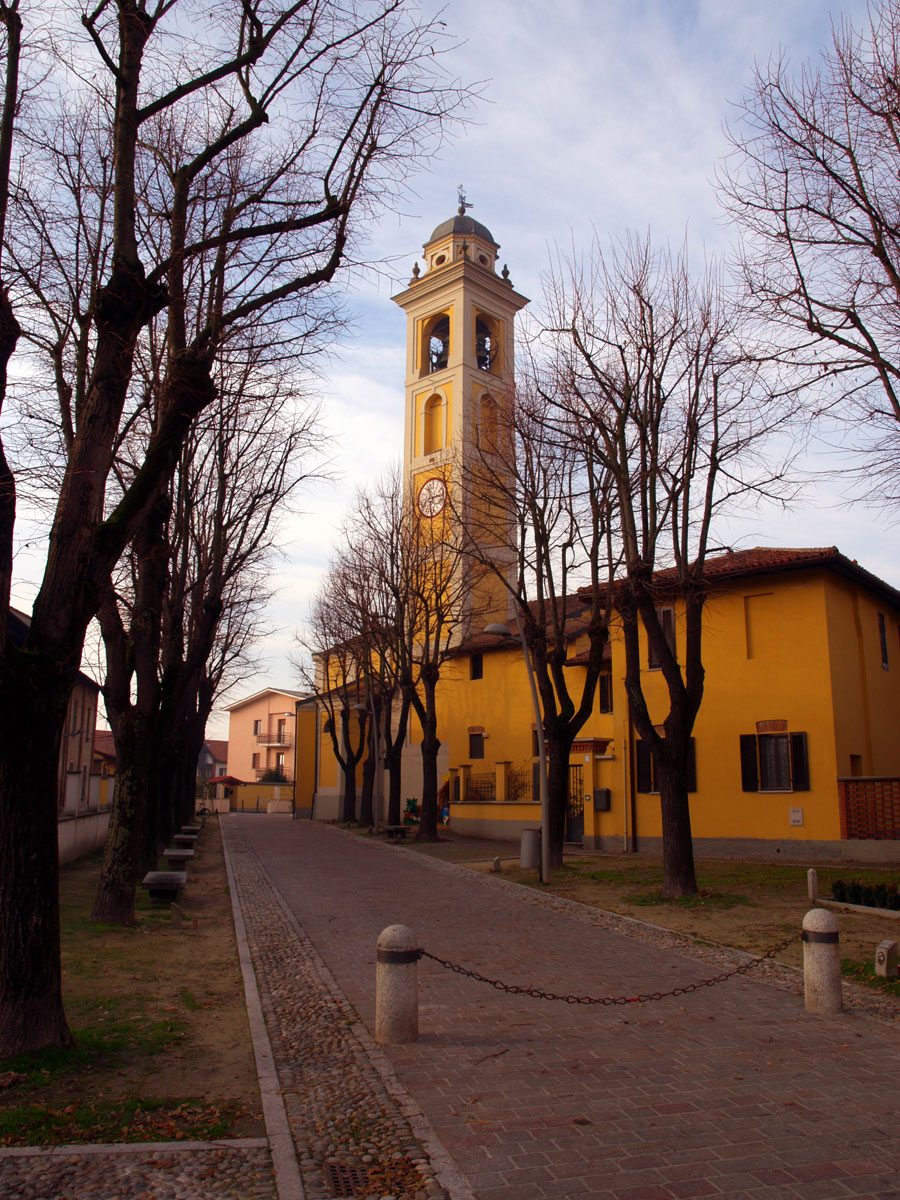
- Church of Santa Agata, Basiglio

- Coat of arms

- Location within Italy Location within Lombardy
- Coordinates: 45°21′N 9°10′E
- Country: Italy
- Region: Lombardy
- Metropolitan city: Milan (MI)
- Frazioni: Milano 3, Cascina Vione, Cascina Colombaia

Government
  - Mayor: Lidia Reale

Area
  - Total: 8.5 km^{2} (3.3 sq mi)
- Elevation: 97 m (318 ft)

Population (28 February 2014)
  - Total: 7,780
  - Density: 920/km^{2} (2,400/sq mi)
- Demonym: Basigliesi
- Time zone: UTC+1 (CET)
  - Summer (DST): UTC+2 (CEST)
- Postal code: 20080/20089
- Dialing code: 02
- Website: Official website

Basiglio (Milanese: Basej [baˈzɛj]) is a comune (municipality) in the Metropolitan City of Milan in the Italian region Lombardy, located about 13 kilometres (8 mi) south of Milan. In terms of median income it is the richest municipality of Italy.

Basiglio borders the following municipalities: Zibido San Giacomo, Rozzano, Pieve Emanuele, Lacchiarella.
