= Mediobanca =

Italian investment bank

Mediobanca S.p.A.

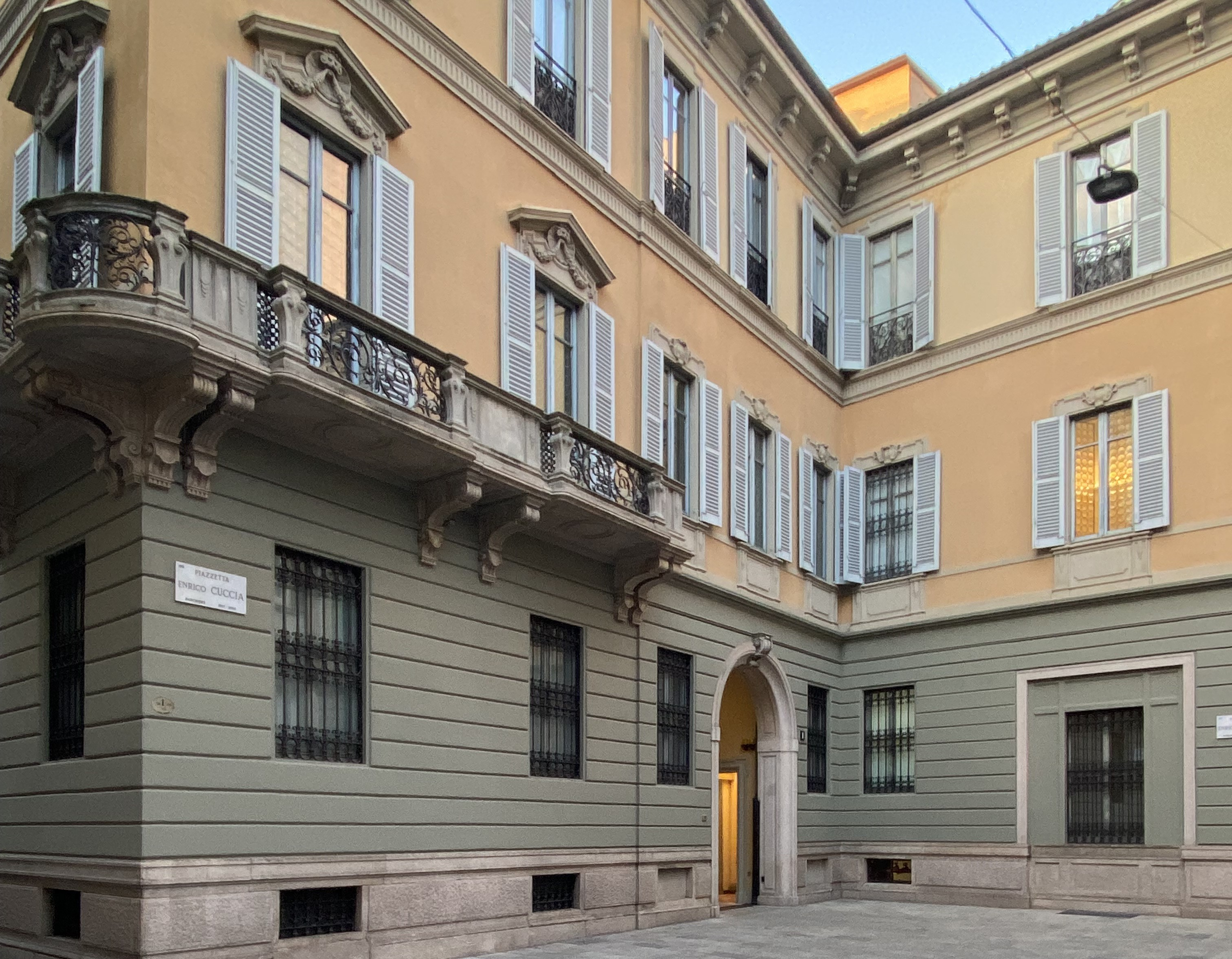
- Headquarters in Milan
- Company type: Public
- Traded as: BIT: MB; FTSE MIB Component
- Industry: Financial services
- Founded: 1946; 80 years ago
- Headquarters: Milan, Italy
- Key people: Renato Pagliaro (chairman); Alberto Nagel (CEO)
- Products: Wealth Management, Corporate & Investment Banking, Consumer Finance
- Revenue: €3.6 billion (2023–2024)
- Net income: €1.27 billion (2023–2024)
- Total assets: €104.583 billion (Q3 2025)
- Total equity: €11.2 billion (2023–2024)
- Owner: Banca Monte dei Paschi di Siena (MPS)
- Number of employees: 5,443 (2023–2024)
- Website: www.mediobanca.com

Mediobanca S.p.A. is an Italian investment bank founded in 1946 at the initiative of Raffaele Mattioli (at that time CEO of Banca Commerciale Italiana) and Enrico Cuccia to facilitate the post-World War II reconstruction of Italian industry. Cuccia led Mediobanca from 1946 to 1982. Today, it is an international banking group with offices in Milan, Frankfurt, London, Madrid, Luxembourg, New York and Paris.

As of today, Mediobanca Group is a diversified banking group consisting of four business divisions: Wealth Management, Corporate & Investment Banking, Consumer Finance and Insurance. The Wealth Management area, whose launch in 2016 reshaped the group's strategy, recorded the highest growth rates in the second half of 2023 and is expected to become by 2026 the first business in terms of fee income and the second in terms of revenues.

The company is listed in the FTSE MIB index of the Borsa Italiana and a member of the Standard Ethics Italian Banks Index.

Mediobanca has been designated as a Significant Institution since the entry into force of European Banking Supervision in late 2014, and as a consequence is directly supervised by the European Central Bank.

== History ==
Mediobanca was set up to provide medium-term financing for manufacturers and establish a direct relationship between the banking sector and the investment needs of the reorganization of industry after the devastation caused by World War II. The Banking Act of 1936 established a clear separation between short term and medium-to-long term financing and the major banks had opted for specializing in short-term loans and there was the institution that would deal with financing for the flotation of companies that wished to obtain a stock market listing. In addition to granting consolidated loans against certificates of deposit and savings books, Mediobanca developed its activity of placement of bonds and shares issued by Italian companies. The professionalism developed by the bank under the, some would say brilliant, guidance of Enrico Cuccia enabled it to quickly acquire a position of leadership in the field of investment banking in Italy. In the mid-1950s, Mediobanca entered into agreements with important foreign partners (Lazard Group, Berliner Handels-Gesellschaft, Lehman Brothers, Sofina) that enabled the bank to play a role on the international market and obtained a Stock Exchange listing in 1956.

Since its origins, Mediobanca has operated in collateral areas to the credit market, such as trust management (1948 with Spafid), the promotion of international trade (through trading companies mainly operating between Italy and Africa in the mid-1950s), consumer credit (in 1960 through the company Compass which had been set up ten years earlier to develop new initiatives with industrial partners), auditing (1961 with Reconta, which was the first Italian audit firm), leasing operations (1970 with Selma). The placement of securities of Italian companies on the domestic market and abroad led to the acquisition of small holdings which have increased over time reinvesting part of the profits. They became the bank's main real investment for the protection of its equity. These packages favored the retention of major customers, the most important being Assicurazioni Generali, Montedison, SNIA Viscosa, Pirelli and Fiat. In 1963, together with other banks and financial institutions, Mediobanca led the formation of the first shareholder syndicate to intervene in the capital of a company, Olivetti, with the objective of redefining its strategic purchases on several occasions of Generali shares led to the bank being its largest shareholder (currently 13%). There were numerous, equally important, operations with Montedison, Fiat, SNIA Viscosa and Italcementi. These and other firms operated with Mediobanca were commonly called the 'Northern Galaxy'.

When Mediobanca was set up, the shareholders authorized Enrico Cuccia to operate using his own judgment and he kept the bank free from the political influences that gradually affected IRI, the public entity that controlled the three Italian banks of national interest that were Mediobanca's majority shareholders. 1982 saw the beginning of a period of intense friction with IRI under the presidency of Romano Prodi, when the three banks were instructed to discontinue Mr. Cuccia's mandate. Cuccia resigned as general manager by was elected to the Board by the shareholder Lazard while Mediobanca continued to be managed by two of his trusted aides, Silvio Salteri as CEO and Vincenzo Maranghi, his generally accepted "heir". In 1988, when Antonio Maccanico took over the presidency, the conflict was settled and the bank was privatized by the setting up of a shareholders' syndicate with equal representation of banking groups (initially the three founding banks) and private groups. On that occasion the position of CEO went to Vincenzo Maranghi and Cuccia accepted his appointment as Honorary President maintaining a symbolic presence in the bank and performing strategic consultancy. After Antonio Maccanico, called to government posts, the presidency went to Francesco Cìngano, who was Mattioli's successor in Banca Commerciale Italiana.

=== 1990s ===
The new banking law passed in 1993, abolished the specialization requirement allowing ordinary banks to enter the medium/long term credit market and generated a series of problems between Mediobanca and its banking partners, which ceased to be the almost exclusive channel for the placement of term deposits and bonds. In the changing context of the financial markets of the early 1990s, Mediobanca evolved by engaging more decisively in investment banking operations, creating a major diversification in the private banking business and expanding its consumer credit area, finally developing an international presence. In the 1990s, it was among the main players in the Italian program of privatization of large state-owned enterprises (the largest operations concerned Telecom Italia, Enel, Banca di Roma and Banca Nazionale del Lavoro), also contributing to foreign programs in the United Kingdom, France, Germany and Spain.

Its final and perhaps greatest coup was its decisive role in the 1999 takeover of Telecom Italia by Olivetti. The deal was decided by the narrowest of margins with 51% of shareholders voting in favour of the deal. Under Cuccia's leadership, which lasted until his death in 2000, the bank was widely described as "secretive" despite being publicly traded: meetings with analysts or interviews with the media were not granted.

=== 2000s ===
The death of Enrico Cuccia in June 2000 exacerbated tensions with the banking shareholders. In April 2003, Vincenzo Maranghi agreed to resign as long as the bank's independence was preserved. This was achieved by promoting two of his aides to top management positions, Alberto Nagel and Renato Pagliaro. They developed market operations more intensely (IPOs, M&A, trading of financial instruments), reducing the weight of historical shareholdings (some of which, like Fiat, were sold). They also achieved penetration of the main foreign markets, where the bank's presence was established through local professional teams. With the launch of Che Banca! in 2008, operations in the retail banking segment expanded creating a model of multi-channel distribution (Internet, call centers, branches) capable of providing substantial deposit flows.

While the years immediately following the resignation of Maranghi entailed the appointment of an external Presidency (Gabriele Galateri and Cesare Geronzi), subsequent events reestablished all the conditions guaranteeing the independence of the institution whose leadership today has Alberto Nagel as CEO and Renato Pagliaro as president.

In 2001, the partnership between Mediobanca and Banca Mediolanum gave life to Banca Esperia, a project launched within Mediobanca and designed starting from an intuition of Alberto Nagel with the aim of offering the institution's entrepreneurial clients support in the management of liquidity deriving from extraordinary operations carried out by the institution's Corporate & Investment Banking division.

Banca Esperia laid the groundwork for the launch of Mediobanca Private Banking. The division serving large Italian entrepreneurial families of Mediobanca was officially established in December 2017 after the acquisition of 50% stake owned by Banca Mediolanum and with the subsequent merger by incorporation of Banca Esperia within Mediobanca.

The ambition of this division was precisely the one imagined by Nagel at the end of the 1990s: to become the first Private & Investment Bank in Italy, a model that is now also highly regarded by the financial community.

With the launch of CheBanca! in 2008, a digital native bank, Mediobanca expanded its funding model by accessing substantial deposit flows. In the following 15 years CheBanca! created and leveraged on a model of multi-channel distribution (Internet, call centers, branches) for providing Wealth Management services to Italian households.

=== 2010s ===
Starting with the 2016–19 strategic plan, Mediobanca outlined a new growth path for CheBanca!, with an increasing focus on managing Italian’s savings and investments. Such a positioning played a more and more relevant role in the strategic plans that followed, especially in the 2023–26 strategic plan "One Brand One Culture" in which the growth of the Wealth Management division has been defined as a priority objective for the Group.

=== 2020s ===
According to the strategic guidelines, in January 2024 Mediobanca launched Mediobanca Premier, a new bank of the Group specializing in wealth management and investments for Italian households, which combines and enhances two of the Group's fundamental assets: on the one hand the expertise gained by Mediobanca in over 70 years of activity on the markets alongside businesses, and on the other the heritage from CheBanca!.

In January 2025, Mediobanca rejected a takeover offer from Banca Monte dei Paschi di Siena (MPS) €13.3 billion.

In March 2025, Mediobanca proposed another term for CEO Philippe Donnet at the helm of the country's largest insurer. Generali's investors will vote on a new board on April 24, with Mediobanca's proposal expected. However, the insurer's second and third largest investors have previously opposed Donnet. Mediobanca also suggested another term for Chairman Andrea Sironi. Meanwhile, a group of Italian fund managers owning around 0.7% of Generali proposed four candidates for the new board.

In April 2025, Mediobanca launched a €6.3bn takeover bid for Banca Generali. Mediobanca offer for Banca Generali takes place while Mediobanca seeks to fend off a hostile bid from Monte dei Paschi di Siena. Mediobanca intends to fund its proposed takeover of Banca Generali by selling its 13% stake in Assicurazioni Generali, which is worth around €6.5bn.

At the end of August, Mediobanca shareholders rejected the proposal put forward by the bank's management to acquire Banca Generali, while MPS improved its offer on Mediobanca by adding €750 million-euro. On September 8, Monte dei Paschi di Siena secured 62% of Mediobanca's shares, thus gaining control of the Milanese lender.

On October 7, 2025, it was announced that MPS completed the acquisition of an 86.3% stake in Mediobanca, in a deal valued at €16.5 billion. In February 2026, MPS board of directors approved a full merger with Mediobanca, which will result in Mediobanca being delisted from the Milan stock exchange.

== Business ==
Mediobanca's business structure today consists of four specialized areas: Wealth Management, Corporate & Investment Banking, Consumer Finance and Insurance.

Starting from 2003, Mediobanca simplified the structure of the group by exiting the non-strategic equity investments inherited from the historical management; in 2019, revenues from equity investments refer mainly to the share in Assicurazioni Generali.

The Wealth Management division (25% of Group revenues) is segmented as follows:

- Affluent & Premier clients are managed by Mediobanca Premier;
- the Private Banking, HNWI & UHNWI segment is managed by Mediobanca Private Banking, CMB Monaco (leader in Monaco);
- the Asset Management platform is composed of the subsidiaries Mediobanca SGR, Polus Capital (based in London and New York) and RAM Active Investments (based in Switzerland)
- Fiduciary services are managed by the subsidiary Spafid S.p.A.

Mediobanca is active in Corporate & Investment Banking (22% of revenues), directly and through subsidiaries (in particular Messier & Associès, based in Paris and Arma Partners, based in London and offices in the Principality of Monaco), covering the following areas: financial services for companies and in particular in M&A, Capital Market, Corporate Lending and Trading services.

The Consumer Finance division (34% of revenues) consists mainly of the subsidiary company Compass Banca S.p.A.

In line with the Group's sustainability policy, at the end of fiscal year 2022–23 Mediobanca selected 100 percent of new investments in asset management using both ESG and financial criteria and obtained 100 percent of energy procurement from renewable resources. Mediobanca also achieved climate neutrality in 2023, in adherence to the program of the UN-sponsored Net-Zero Banking Alliance, in which the Group participates.

In July 2023, Mediobanca created a joint venture with Founders Factory, a London-based venture studio and startup accelerator and leader in the fintech sector, with the aim of investing in the development of 35 innovative companies in the financial services sector.

== Shareholder structure ==
As of 1 October 2025, Mediobanca's main shareholder is Banca Monte dei Paschi di Siena with a 86,35% controlling share. Goldman Sachs holds a 6.55% minority stake.

== International branches ==
Since 2006 Mediobanca has embarked on an internationalization process with the aim of expanding its market base, diversifying counterparty risk and assisting its clients in their cross-border transactions. In Corporate and Investment Banking, Mediobanca has operations throughout continental Europe through branch offices opened in London, Luxembourg, Paris and Madrid. In these countries the Bank's strategy is to provide corporate finance activities through a wide range of corporate and leveraged finance, corporate lending, debt capital market and equity capital market services. The New York office performs brokerage and representative activities. Since summer 2013 Mediobanca has had a footprint in Turkey through subsidiary Mediobanca Advisory. The London branch office, set up in 2008, consists of specialist teams: Credit, Rates, FX, Alternatives and Equity Derivatives, Corporate Lending and Leveraged Finance, Equity research and Advisory. As well as its role as equity and derivatives platform, the London office is strategic in strengthening relations with hedge funds and private equity funds. Since 2014 the London office has also been home to the FIG EMEA team.

Mediobanca's international activities are characterized by the cross-market presence in the European market of the Corporate & Investment Banking division, which has also been consolidated through several acquisitions abroad. The most recent, in May 2023, was the acquisition of Arma Partners, a UK-based company that is a leader in the digital economy market for advisory in the contexts of M&A transactions. Mediobanca strengthened its presidium in France and began the development of a pan-European Corporate & Investment Banking platform in 2019 with the acquisition of Messier Maris & Associés, an investment bank based in Paris with offices in New York, with a team of 40 professionals.

In the Wealth Management area, Mediobanca's international presence consists of the asset management firms Polus Capital Management (specialising in alternative credit strategies launched in 2022 following the strategic combination of two leading European credit managers, Cairn Capital – acquired in 2015 – and Bybrook Capital – acquired in 2021) and RAM Active Investments (systematic equity operator acquired in 2017) and of CMB Monaco, leader in the private banking market in Monaco.

Among the acquisitions in Wealth Management it has been relevant the acquisition (carried out by the subsidiary CheBanca!) of some retail business operations of Barclays Italy, transaction announced in 2016 that increased CheBanca!'s positioning in investment management.

Mediobanca also started the geographical diversification of the Group's Consumer Finance division in 2023, taking over 100% stake in HeidiPay Switzerland AG, fintech firm specializing in Buy Now Pay Later. The deal strengthened the Group's operations in the BNPL sector as well as the 2022 acquisition of Italian fintech company Soisy.

== See also ==
- List of banks in the euro area
- List of banks in Italy
