= Enrico Cuccia =

Italian financier (1907–2000)

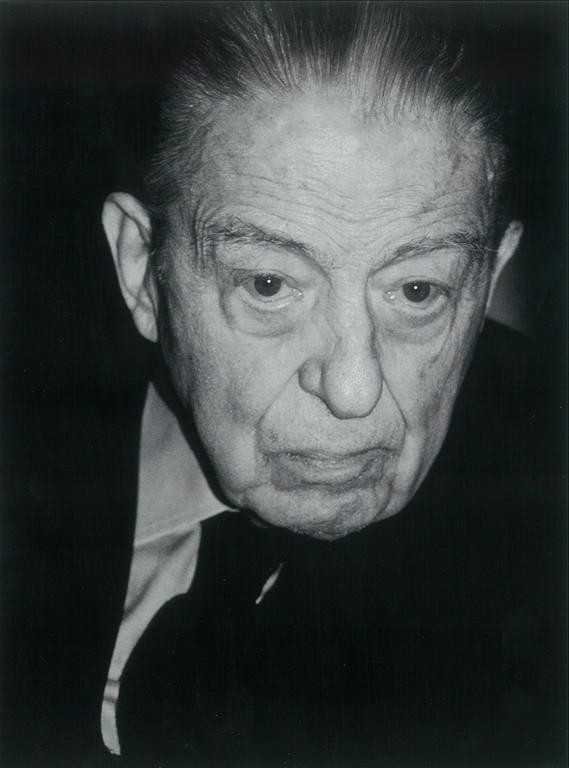
- Born: 24 November 1907; Rome, Kingdom of Italy
- Died: 23 June 2000 (aged 92); Milan, Italy
- Occupation: Financier
- Years active: 1930s–1982
- Spouse: Idea Nuova
- Children: Two daughters and a son

Enrico Cuccia (24 November 1907 – 23 June 2000) was an Italian banker, who was the first and long-term president of Mediobanca SpA, the Milan-based investment bank, and a significant figure in the history of capitalism in Italy.

== Early life and education ==
Cuccia was born into a Sicilian family in Rome on 24 November 1907. He was of Arbereshe origin. His family was Catholic. His father was a senior civil servant at the finance ministry. In 1930, Enrico Cuccia received a law degree.

== Career ==
Cuccia started his career as a journalist, but he left soon. He began to work at the Central Bank of Italy and served in Ethiopia. In 1934, he joined the state-run holding group, Istituto per la Ricostruzione Industriale (IRI). Then he began to serve as a manager at IRI's Banca Commerciale Italiana in 1938.

In 1946, Cuccia was appointed president of Mediobanca when it was founded. Subsequently, he was the first head of the bank, which was initially named as Banca di Credito Finanziaro. In 1982, he retired from the board of Mediobanca and was given the title of honorary president. Antonio Maccanico succeeded him in the post. Cuccia kept an office at the bank until his death in 2000.

Cuccia also served as a personal adviser of the Agnelli family. However, their alliance ended at the end of the 1990s.

=== Activities ===
Cuccia shaped the Italian company patterns until 1992 when a bill became effective in order to encourage the privatization of state-owned companies and banks. He was the major contributor to the merge of Montecatini and Edison into Montedison, which occurred in 1966. The merger was the first reorganisation of the chemical industry. He was also instrumental in Olivetti's takeover of Telecom Italia in 1999. In addition to these much more visible activities, he "was the principal dealmaker (and breaker) in the secretive world of large private Italian capitalism."

== Personal life ==
Cuccia married Idea Nuova Socialista (meaning New Socialist Idea in English) Beneduce and had three children, two daughters and a son. They had known each other since high school and got married in 1939. Cuccia's spouse was the daughter of Alberto Beneduce, the founder and president of the IRI.

== Death and burial ==
Cuccia underwent an operation for prostate cancer in April 2000. He died at the Monzino Foundation cardiological center in Milan on 23 June 2000 at the age of 92. After a private funeral ceremony on 24 June, he was buried in the family graveyard in his villa in Meina, a village beside Lake Maggiore. His body was laid under the body of his wife.

However, Cuccia's corpse was stolen on 18 March 2001. The thieves sent a letter, demanding a ransom of $3.5 million to be paid to a foreign bank account. The corpse was found on a mountainside near Turin, and two men arrested in relation to the incident at the end of March. They were convicted and given a suspended sentence in December 2001.

== Legacy and personality ==
The square where the head offices of Mediobanca are located in Milan was named after Enrico Cuccia in September 2000. In 1998, Global Finance magazine regarded him as one of the 600 most powerful financial players in the world.

Cuccia never gave interviews and was not commonly seen in public despite his huge influence on the country's finance system. He was interested in philosophy, mysticism and the work of James Joyce.

According to the Italian historian of Freemasonry Aldo Alessandro Mola, Cuccia was initiated to the highest degree of the Gran Loggia d'Italia. Given that Cuccia was the son-in-law of Alberto Beneduce, a Master Mason, since 1906 and the Primo Gran Sorvegliante of the Grand Orient of Italy during the presidency of Ernesto Nathan this view becomes more reliable.
