= Ennio Doris =

Italian businessman (1940–2021)

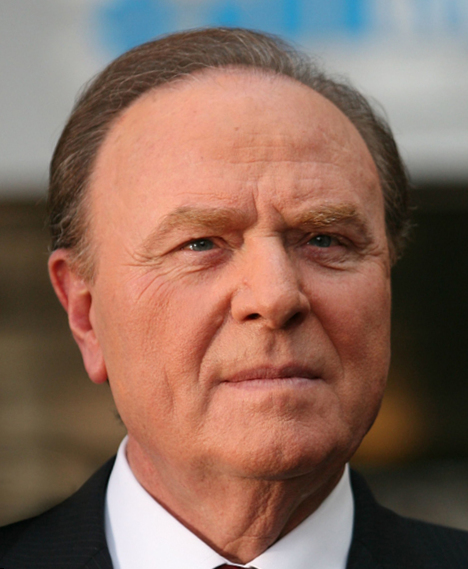
- Doris in 2016
- Born: 3 July 1940; Tombolo, Italy
- Died: 24 November 2021 (aged 81); Milan, Italy
- Occupation: Businessman
- Title: Chairman, Banca Mediolanum
- Spouse: Lina Tombolato
- Children: 2
- Family: Doris family

Ennio Doris (3 July 1940 – 24 November 2021) was an Italian billionaire businessman who founded Mediolanum SpA. Until 21 September 2021, he was chairman of Banca Mediolanum, part of Gruppo Mediolanum, a large Italian banking, funds management, and insurance group.

== Early life ==
Doris was born in Tombolo, a small town near Padua, Italy, on 3 July 1940.

== Career ==
Doris entered the retail asset management field in 1969 when he became a salesman for Fideuram. In 1971 he joined Dival, where he rose to be the head of a 700-person sales force. In 1982 he started his own company "Programma Italia" and convinced Silvio Berlusconi to invest 250,000 Euro in return for a half share of the company. His strategy was to focus on retail client relationships while subcontracting the management of invested funds to other firms. Under his charismatic leadership, his network of salesmen grew rapidly as did the funds under management. He added insurance and banking and renamed the firm Mediolanum. In June 1996 the company was floated on the Italian stock market. Berlusconi described it as the best investment he had ever made.

== Personal life ==
Doris was married, with two children, and lived in Tombolo, Italy. His son, Massimo Doris, is the CEO of Banca Mediolanum. Doris owned the 197-foot sailing yacht Seven.

Doris died on 24 November 2021.

== Honors ==
- Order of Merit of the Italian Republic (27 December 1992)
- Order of Merit for Labour (30 May 2002)

== Publications ==
- Doris, Ennio (2014). C'è anche domani. Saggi. Milan: Sperling & Kupfer. ISBN 978-88-200-5586-8.

== See also ==
- List of billionaires
