= Banca Esperia =

- Native name: Banca Esperia S.p.A.
- Company type: joint venture of listed companies
- Industry: Financial services
- Founded: 2001
- Defunct: 2017
- Headquarters: Italy
- Number of locations: 12 branches (2014)
- Services: Private banking
- Net income: €1.842 million (2014)
- Total assets: ▼€1.799 billion (2014)
- Total equity: ▲€181.429 million (2014)
- Owner: Mediobanca; Banca Mediolanum
- Subsidiaries: Esperia Servizi Fiduciari; Esperia Trust Company; Duemme SGR; Duemme International Luxembourg
- Capital ratio: 13.08% (CET1)
- Website: gruppoesperia.it
- Footnotes / references in consolidated basis

Banca Esperia S.p.A. was an Italian bank which was a joint venture of Mediobanca and Banca Mediolanum (before 2015: Mediolanum S.p.A.).

In 2017, Mediobanca acquired the 50% stake owned by Banca Mediolanum laying the foundations for the launch of Mediobanca Private Banking (thanks to the subsequent merger by incorporation of Banca Esperia within Mediobanca).
