= Miniassegno =

Type of notgeld circulated in Italy in the late 1970s

Miniassegni (pl. of miniassegno [ˌmini.asˈseɲɲo]) were a type of notgeld that was circulated in Italy in the late 1970s. Miniassegni were used as replacement for change which had become very scarce. Before miniassegni appeared, widely used replacement for coins had been telephone tokens, candy or other small merchandise items, and - in some cities - public transport tickets.

== History ==
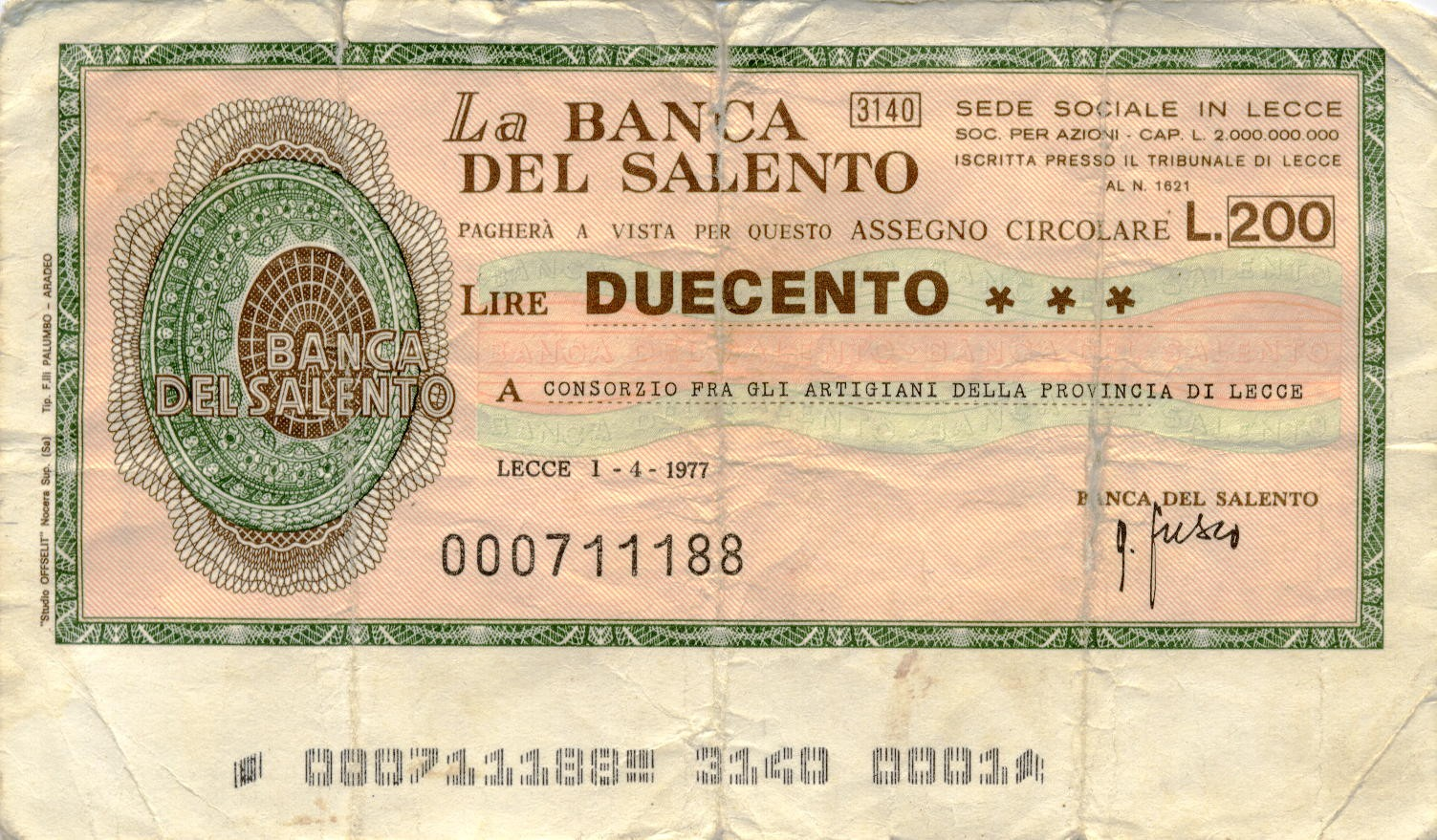
Miniassegno issued by Banca del Salento, 1977

The first miniassegni were issued on December 10, 1975, by Istituto Bancario San Paolo, with a face value of Lit.100, (about US$0.14 at 1983 exchange rates). Many banks soon followed by issuing miniassegni with face values of Lit.50, Lit.100, Lit.150, Lit.200, Lit.250, Lit.300 and Lit.350. Their name (mini-checks) indicated that they were money orders (assegni circolari in Italian), but smaller than normal.

To overcome the prohibition to issue currency (exclusive prerogative of the Bank of Italy), banks were printing actual bank drafts, made payable to various small entities and companies with their pre-printed endorsement. The checks were then treated as bearer securities, and exchanged by the public as if they were real currency.

At their peak, there existed 835 different types of miniassegni, issued by 42 banks, for a total estimated value of more than Lit.200 billion. Some banks issued "illustrated" series with distinctive designs. These issues, printed in limited quantities, were sold to collectors at a substantial markup. At some point, even department stores chimed in, printing goods-redeemable gift certificates in small denominations.

Printing miniassegni was widely believed to be a boon for the issuers, which sold them to retailers, pressured by the dearth of small denomination coins. However, many cheques were never returned, either because they were destroyed by wear (which was substantial, due to the poor quality of the paper) or because they disappeared from circulation hoarded by collectors, or forgotten by their holders, which did not much care, due to their diminutive value.

Miniassegni disappeared by the end of 1978, when the Government Printing Office and Mint was finally able to overcome the shortage of small change. The cause of the coin scarcity was never fully established, although a number of explanations circulated at the time. These included claims that the face value of the coins was lower than the value of the metal they contained, or that Italian coins were being used as watch cases by Swiss watchmakers. Most of these explanations are now regarded as inaccurate. In an essay written several years later, Hans Magnus Enzensberger reviewed a number of contemporary explanations and suggested that one probable cause was a temporary technical inadequacy at the Italian Mint, compounded by bureaucratic complications.

== Issuers ==
Banks who issued miniassegni 1975 and 1978:

- Banca Agricola Commerciale di Reggio Emilia,
- Banca Antoniana,
- Banca Belinzaghi,
- Banca Calderari e Maggioli,
- Banca Cattolica del Veneto,
- Banca del Friuli,
- Banca del Salento,
- Banca di Credito Agrario Bresciano,
- Banca di Credito Agrario di Ferrara,
- Banca di Trento e Bolzano,
- Banca Industriale Gallaratese,
- Banca Popolare del Montefeltro e del Metauro,
- Banca Popolare di Bergamo,
- Banca Popolare di Crema,
- Banca Popolare di Lecco,
- Banca Popolare di Matino e Lecce,
- Banca Popolare di Milano,
- Banca Popolare di Novara,
- Banca Provinciale Lombarda,
- Banca San Paolo di Brescia,
- Banca Sella.
- Banco Ambrosiano,
- Banco di Chiavari e della Riviera Ligure,
- Banco di Napoli,
- Banco di Santo Spirito,
- Banco di Sicilia,
- Banco Lariano,
- Cassa di Risparmio di Biella,
- Cassa di Risparmio di Cuneo,
- Cassa di Risparmio di Jesi,
- Cassa di Risparmio di Padova e Rovigo,
- Cassa di Risparmio di Trento e Rovereto,
- Cassa di Risparmio di Venezia,
- Cassa Rurale ed Artigiana di Cantù,
- Credito Artigiano,
- Credito Italiano,
- Credito Varesino,
- Istituto Bancario Italiano,
- Istituto Bancario San Paolo di Torino,
- Istituto Centrale delle Banche Popolari Italiane,
- Istituto Centrale delle Casse Rurali ed Artigiane,
- Istituto Centrale di Banche e Banchieri,

== Literature ==
- Alberto Gullino, Sergio Boasso: Catalogo euro-unificato dei Mini-Assegni. 368 S., Verlag Alfa Edizioni, Turin 2002, ISBN 978-88-88032-08-5
- Hans Magnus Enzensberger: Italienische Ausschweifungen. Die Münze, in: Ach Europa! Wahrnehmungen aus sieben Ländern. Mit einem Epilog aus dem Jahre 2006, Suhrkamp, Frankfurt am Main 1987, S. 86–102
- Adelmo Manna: I delitti contro la fede pubblica e l'economia pubblica. Wolters Kluwer, Mailand 2010, S. 99–100, ISBN 978-88-5980420-8

== See also ==
- Economy of Italy
