= Banco BPM =

Italian bank

Banco BPM S.p.A.

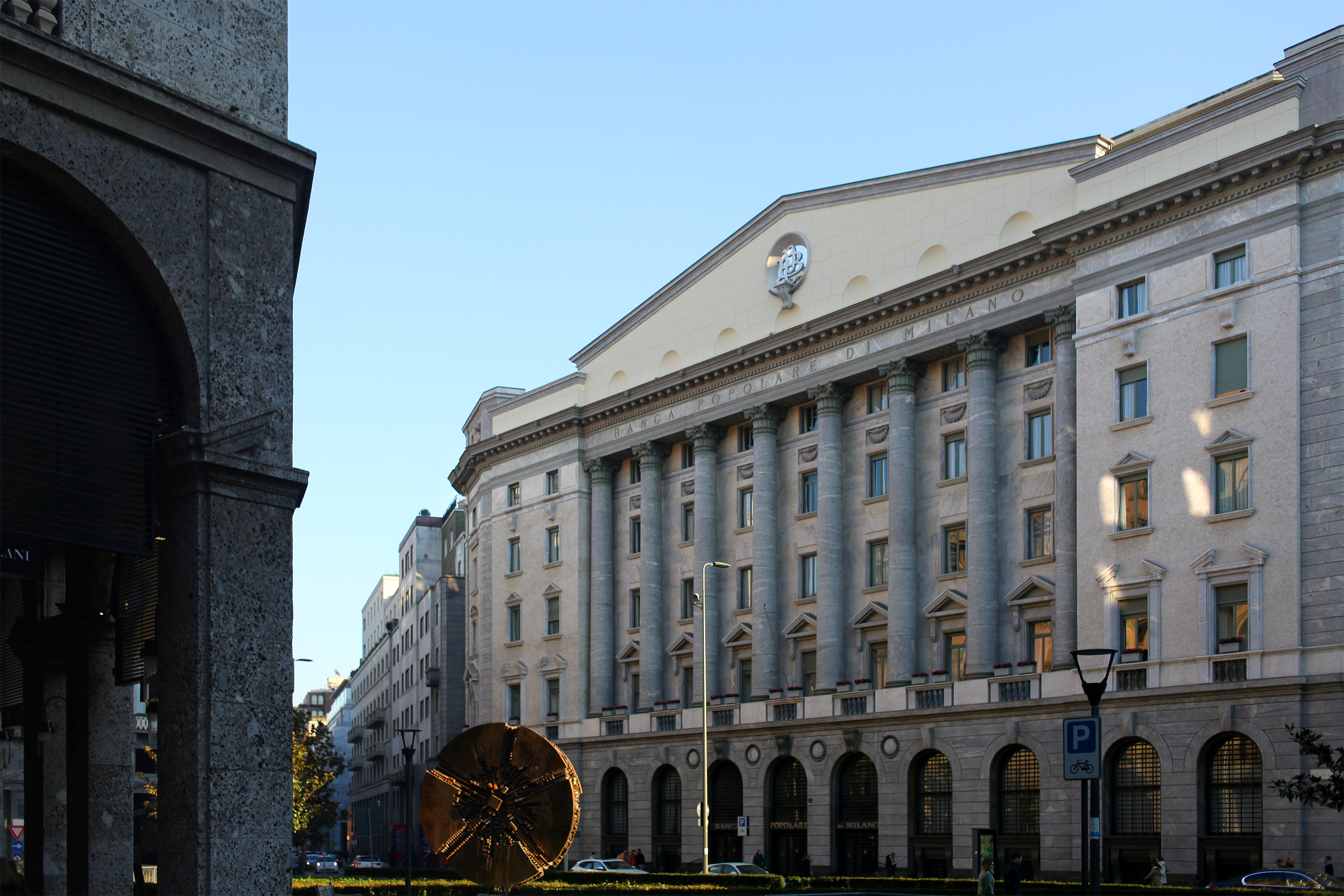
- Milan head office
- Type: Public
- Traded as: BIT: BAMI; FTSE MIB component
- ISIN: IT0005218380
- Industry: Financial services
- Predecessor: Banco Popolare S.C.; Banca Popolare di Milano S.c. a r.l.
- Founded: 1 January 2017; 9 years ago
Headquarters
Milan, Italy	(registered office)
Verona, Italy	(general office)
- Number of locations: 1,436 domestic branches, excluding foreign subsidiaries and representative offices (2023)
- Key people: Carlo Fratta Pasini; (chairman); Giuseppe Castagna; (CEO)
- Brands: List: Banca Popolare di Verona; Banco S.Geminiano e S.Prospero; Banco San Marco; Banca Popolare del Trentino; Cassa di Risparmio di Imola; Banca Popolare di Novara; Banco Popolare Siciliano; Credito Bergamasco; Banca Popolare di Lodi; CassadiRisparmio di Lucca Pisa Livorno; Banco di Chiavari e della Riviera Ligure; Banca Popolare di Cremona; Banca Popolare di Crema
- Services: retail banking; investment banking; corporate banking; insurance (via joint venture); financial leasing
- Revenue: ▲€5.341 billion (2023)
- Operating income: ▲€2.770 billion (2023)
- Net income: ▲€1.264 billion (2023)
- Total assets: €210,879 billion (Q2 2026)
- Total equity: ▲€14.038 billion (2023)
- Number of employees: 19,011 (2023)
- Subsidiaries: Banca Popolare di Milano S.p.A.; Banca Akros; Banca Aletti; ProFamily
- Capital ratio: ▲14.2% (Group CET1, end 2023)
- Website: www.bancobpm.it

Banco BPM S.p.A. is an Italian bank that commenced operations on 1 January 2017, by the merger (approved by the board of directors on 24 May 2016) of Banco Popolare and Banca Popolare di Milano (BPM). The bank is the third largest retail and corporate banking conglomerate in Italy (in terms of total assets in 2016), behind Intesa Sanpaolo and UniCredit. The bank has dual headquarters in Verona and Milan respectively.

The shares of the bank are a constituent of Italian blue chip index FTSE MIB; in 2018 Forbes Global 2000, Banco BPM was ranked the 831st. Banco Popolare and BPM, then Banco BPM have been designated as a Significant Institution since the entry into force of European Banking Supervision in late 2014, and as a consequence Banco BPM is directly supervised by the European Central Bank.

== History ==
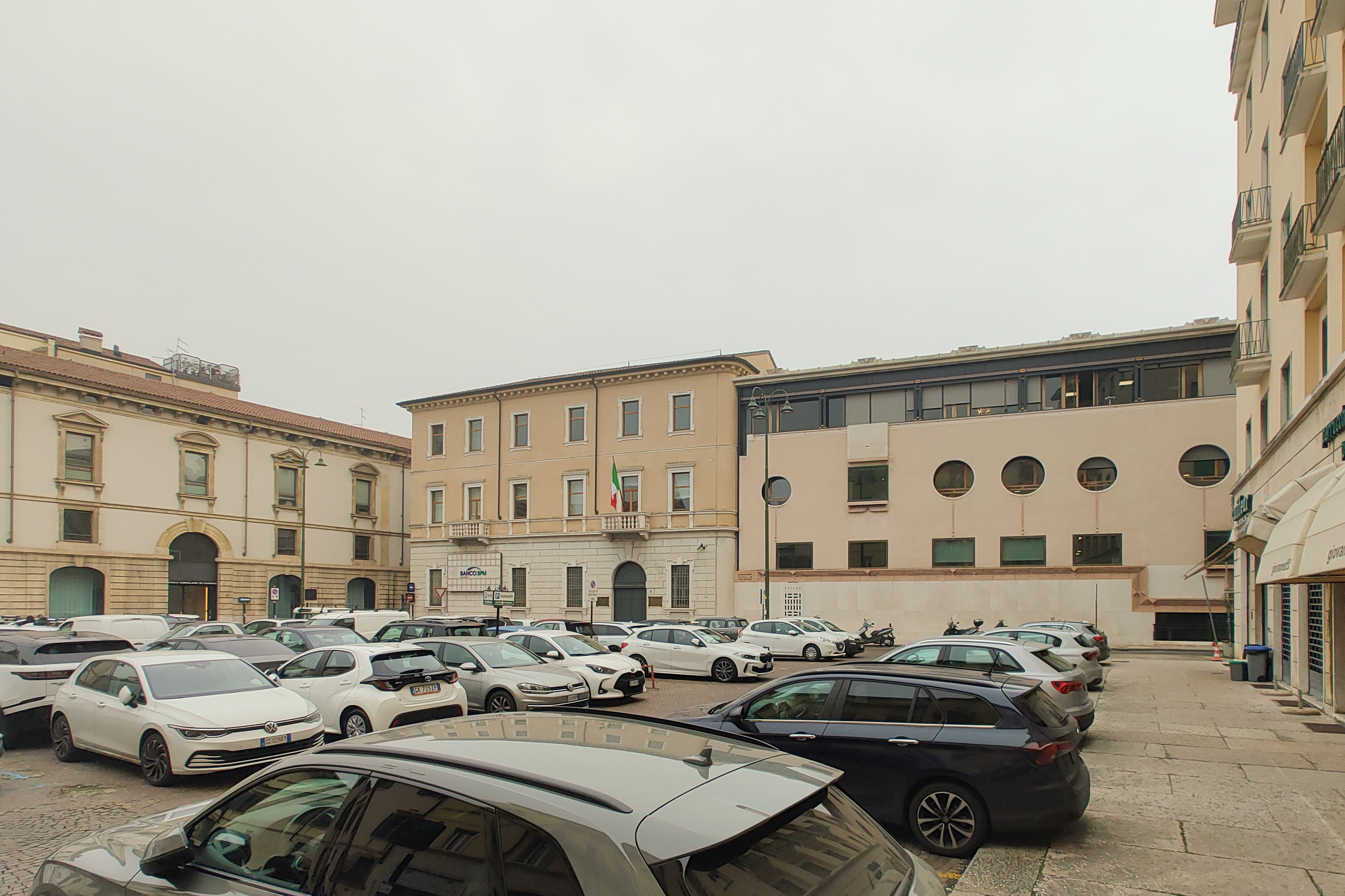
Palazzo Scarpa in Verona, the general office of Banco BPM

As of 1 January 2017, the date of formation, Banco BPM is the third largest retail and commercial banking conglomerate by pro forma total assets in Italy, behind UniCredit and Intesa Sanpaolo, and surpassing the former third largest bank Banca Monte dei Paschi di Siena (€164.385 billion at mid-2016). Although the Bank of Italy, the central bank, and Cassa Depositi e Prestiti (CDP), the national investment bank, technically have larger total assets than Banco BPM, they operate in a different line of business.

As of 30 June 2016, Banco Popolare had total assets of €123.699 billion and net assets of €8.876 billion in a consolidated basis, while Banca Popolare di Milano (BPM) had a total assets of €49.698 billion and a net assets of €4.571 billion. However, they had a similar size in terms of market capitalization, both already suppressed Banca Monte dei Paschi di Siena.

The shareholders of Banco BPM are the former shareholders of Banco Popolare and Banca Popolare di Milano in a proposed ratio of 54.626%:45.374%. After the capital increase of Banco Popolare in mid-2016, the final exchange ratio for the merger was 1 share of Banco Popolare to 1 share of Banco BPM, as well as 6.386 shares of Banca Popolare di Milano to 1 share of Banco BPM.

Banco Popolare and BPM themselves were both originated as Popular Banks (Italian: banche popolari), a kind of co-operative bank in Italy, based in cities such as Bergamo, Verona, Modena, Novara and Lodi (Banco Popolare) and Milan, Rome (BPM) respectively. They merged and acquired many banca popolare and cassa di risparmio (savings bank) to become the 4th and 9th largest retail and commercial banking conglomerate (excluding CDP) as of 31 December 2015, in terms of total assets, according to a study of Mediobanca. Banco Popolare and Banca Popolare di Milano were about to demutualize in 2016, due to Italian Law No.3 of 2015, but the two banking group forming a new public società per azioni directly, instead of demutualize themselves. A new subsidiary, Banca Popolare di Milano S.p.A., would be establish to run the brand of BPM for a few years. Eventually BPM's subsidiary Banca Popolare di Mantova S.p.A. became the new Banca Popolare di Milano S.p.A..

On 10 February 2017, the "year zero" financial results was announced. Due to 2016 capital increase of Banco Popolare, the new banking group had a pro forma CET1 capital ratio of 12.30% at 31 December 2016.

In the first year of establishment, the bank sold its asset management subsidiary Aletti Gestielle SGR to Anima Holding for €700 million. In the next year, the bank securitized a bad loans portfolio of €5.1 billion gross book value, credited it as "Project Exodus" and sold the securities to the market. The bank also applied for Garanzia sulla Cartolarizzazione delle Sofferenze (GACS), a state guarantee scheme for the senior tranche of the securities.

On 6 November 2024, Banco BPM announced that its Unit Vita launches voluntary tender offer for the shares of Anima Holding with the aim to get 67% of Anima and then delist it from Euronext.

On 25 November 2024, UniCredit launched a €10.1bn takeover bid for Banco BPM.

In March 2025, the European Central Bank opposed the use of the 'Danish Compromise' (a favourable capital treatment for banks carrying takeovers of asset managers through their insurance businesses) for Banco BPM's acquisition of Anima Holding, but Banco BPM proceeded nonetheless with its bid for Anima Banco BPM launched its buyout offer in March 2025, at a price of €7 per share, for an overall amount of €1.55 billion and, by the beginning of April 2025, Banco BPM's stake in Anima reached 90%, thus granting the Italian bank the control of Anima.

== Controversies ==
The current Banco BPM CEO Giuseppe Castagna has been investigated because he gave bank fundings for millions Euro towards his Communion and Liberation personal friends facing several conflicts of interest, receiving business favors from them in 2012; but the accusation has been archived in 2016.

He was later investigated to be involved with insider trading practices for Banca Popolare di Milano (Banco BPM branch) in 2017 but the accusation has been archived in May 2018.

== Partnership ==
The bank is a premium partner of AC Milan since 2013 with the partnership continually renewed, most recently in 2023.

== Equity interests ==
- Anima Holding (89.95%)
- Banca di Asti (9.99%)

== Shareholders ==
As of July 2026, Banco BPM's main shareholders were:

Shareholder	Stake (% of ordinary shares)
Crédit Agricole SA - Delfinances SAS	29,30%
BlackRock, Inc.	5.61%

== See also ==
- List of banks in the euro area
- List of banks in Italy
