= Banca Italease =

- Native name: Banca Italease S.p.A.
- Formerly: Banca Centrale per il Leasing delle Banche Popolari
- Type: subsidiary of a listed company
- Industry: Financial services
- Defunct: 2015
- Fate: absorbed by the parent company
- Successor: leasing division of Banco Popolare
- Services: leasing and factoring
- Net income: ▼ (€221.189 million) (2014)
- Total assets: ▼€7.378 billion (2014)
- Total equity: ▼€893.582 million (2014)
- Owner: Banco Popolare
- Parent: Banco Popolare
- Subsidiaries: Release S.p.A.
- Capital ratio: 23.29% (CET1)
- Website: Official website (in Italian)
- Footnotes in consolidated basis

Banca Italease S.p.A. was an Italian finance leasing company, based in Milan. The company formed two subsidiaries Alba Leasing (a company that serves SMEs) and a "bad bank" (Release S.p.A.) in 2009. The shares of Alba Leasing were distributed to the former shareholders of Banca Italease, with Banca Italease and Release S.p.A. becoming the subsidiary of Banco Popolare instead. Banca Italease was absorbed into Banco Popolare in 2015 as its leasing division.

== History ==
The company was known as Banca Centrale per il Leasing delle Banche Popolari S.p.A., which was a joint venture of the People's Banks (Italian: Banca Popolari) of Italy.

In 1996 the company absorbed Istituto Triveneto del Leasing.

As at 31 December 2000 the owner were Banca Popolare di Novara (25.52%), Banca Popolare di Bergamo – Credito Varesino (15.37153%), Banca Popolare di Verona – Banco S. Geminiano e S. Prospero (11.314%), Banca Monte dei Paschi di Siena (BMPS) (6.011%), Banca Popolare di Lodi (3.9708%), Banca Popolare di Sondrio (BPSO) (3.558%), Veneto Banca (1%), Banca Popolare dell'Emilia Romagna (BPER) (0.350%), Banca di Cividale (0.033%), Banca Popolare Pugliese and others. The company was a listed company in Borsa Italiana, which Reale Mutua Assicurazioni (6.988%), BMPS (3.344%), Cassa di Risparmio di Biella e Vercelli (0.001%), BPER (7.430%), BPSO (4.252%) and Banco Popolare Group (30.719%) were the owners on 30 June 2009 with more than 2% stake.

The company became part of Banco Popolare Group since the second half of 2009, for 91.225% stake. (in 2002 BPVN owned 38.16% stake, in 2007 Banco Popolare and subsidiaries owned 30.719% stake combined). Alba Leasing, a subsidiary of Italease that formed in 2009, was owned by two former owners of Italease: BPER (36.43%), BPSO (20.95%) and Banca Popolare di Milano (BPM) (9.83%) instead. Banca Italease retained 32.79% stake.

Banca Italease was the sub-holding company of Factorit, Itaca Service, Italease Gestione Beni, Italease Network, Mercantile Leasing, Italease Finance (70%), Release S.p.A. (80.392%) at that time.

On 29 July 2010 Factorit was acquired by BPSO (60.5%) and BPM (30%) also for €155.3 million, with the remaining 9.5% stake retained by Italease. Banco Popolare Group owned 100% stake of Banca Italease at 31 December 2010.

In 2011, the Itaca Service and Italease Gestione Beni were sold to Accenture and Cerved Information Solutions respectively; Mercantile Leasing was absorbed by Banca Italease.

== See also ==
- Istituto Centrale delle Banche Popolari Italiane
- Unione Fiduciaria
- List of banks in Italy
