= Siro Lombardini =

Italian politician (1924–2013)

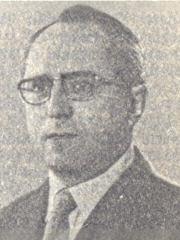

Minister of State Holdings
- In office 5 August 1979 – 4 April 1980
- Prime Minister: Francesco Cossiga

Personal details
- Born: 1924 Milan, Kingdom of Italy
- Died: October 2013 (aged 88–89) Chieri, Italy
- Party: Christian Democracy
- Education: Università Cattolica del Sacro Cuore; London School of Economics; University of Chicago

Siro Lombardini (1924—2013) was an Italian economist and politician. He served as the minister of state holdings between 5 August 1979 and 4 April 1980 in the first cabinet of Francesco Cossiga. He was also the president of the Italian banking institute Banca Popolare di Novara. In addition, he was among the significant economists being a specialist on monopoly theory. One of his well-known students is Romano Prodi.

== Early life and education ==
Lombardini was born in Milan in 1924. He held a bachelor's degree in economics and commerce which he received from Università Cattolica del Sacro Cuore in 1946. He continued his studies at London School of Economics in 1949 and at the University of Chicago which he completed in 1951.

== Career ==
In 1947 Lombardini began his career as a research assistant and following the completion of his PhD he started to give courses in political economy at his alma mater, Università Cattolica. From 1954 to 1958 he also taught at the Faculty of Law of the University of Modena. In 1956 he joined the University of Bari as the chair of the department of political economy. In 1957 Lambordini became a full professor. Next he joined the University of Milan. Then in 1963 he became the department chair of economic policy at the University of Turin. In 1983 he was named the chair of political economy department at Università Cattolica, and he joined again the University of Turin in 1987 to teach political economy.

From 1958 to 1968 Lombardini was the director of the Economic and Social Research Institute in Turin. He later joined the Christian Democrats and became a member of the Italian Senate for the seventh legislature (1976–79). In 1979 he was appointed minister of state holdings to the cabinet led by Prime Minister Francesco Cossiga. Lombardini was in office between 5 August 1979 and 4 April 1980. During his tenure he was accused of involving in the Eni bribe scandal. Following his retirement from politics he was named the president of the Banca Popolare di Novara on 26 September 1995. He merged the institution with the Banca Popolare di Verona which created the current Banco Popolare.

== Personal life and death ==
Lombardini is the recipient of the 1995 Invernizzi Award for the economy. He died in Chieri at the age of 89 in October 2013.
