= Credito Bergamasco =

- Type: brand (former S.p.A.)
- Industry: Financial services
- Founded: 1891
- Headquarters: Bergamo, Italy
- Owner: Banco BPM

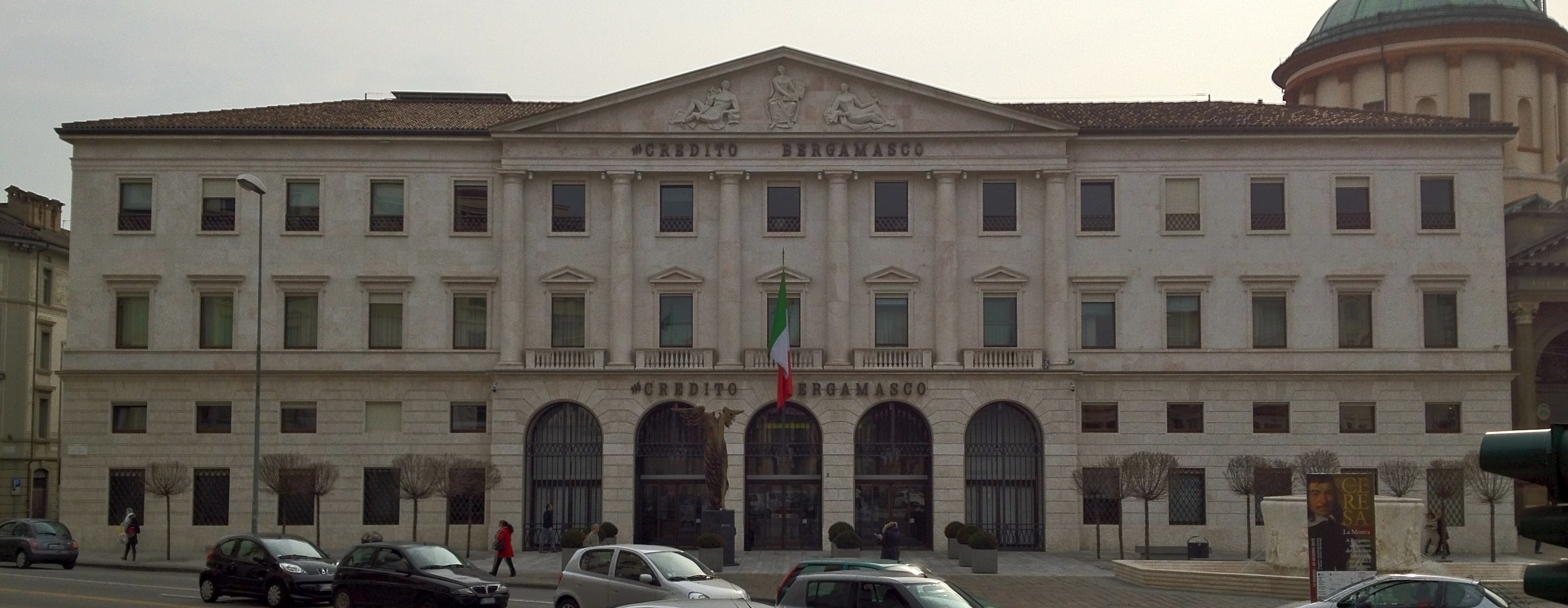

Credito Bergamasco (Creberg) was an Italian bank based in Bergamo, Lombardy. The bank was acquired by Banca Popolare di Verona – Banco S. Geminiano e S. Prospero S.c.a.r.l. in 1997. The bank remained as a list company in Borsa Italiana until 2014. In 2014 it was absorbed into Banco Popolare S.C.. However, the former bank remained as a division of the company.

The bank covered Lombardy region, except Province of Sondrio (no Banco Popolare existence), Province of Lodi (belongs to Banca Popolare di Lodi), Province of Cremona (belongs to Banca Popolare di Cremona and Crema), Province of Pavia (belongs to Banca Popolare di Novara) and Province of Mantova (belongs to Banca Popolare di Verona).

== History ==
In 2006, Banco Popolare di Verona e Novara hold 87.72% shares of Credito Bergamasco. The banking group acquired a minority stake of Creberg from Cattolica Assicurazioni in 2002 and 2004. In 2009 Banco Popolare increased to hold 88.990% shares. In 2010 Banco Popolare acquired the remain shares of Cassa di Risparmio di Lucca Pisa Livorno for cash and the shares of Credito Bergamasco from Fondazione Cassa di Risparmio di Lucca. It made Banco Popolare's holding deceased to 77.428% but with a call option to buy back the shares from the banking foundation, which was expired in 2013. However, on 1 June 2014 Banco Popolare absorbed Credito Bergamasco by issues 1.412 shares of Banco Popolare for each shares of Credito Bergamasco.

== Sponsorship ==
The bank was a sponsor of Atalanta B.C. until 2017. In 2017–18 season, the football club was sponsored by another Bergamo-based bank UBI Banca.

== See also ==
- List of banks in Italy
