= 2005–06 Serie A =

104th season of top-tier Italian football

Serie A
- Season: 2005–06
- Dates: 27 August 2005 – 14 May 2006
- Champions: Inter Milan; 14th title
- Relegated: Lecce; Treviso; Juventus
- Champions League: Inter Milan; Roma; Milan; Chievo
- UEFA Cup: Palermo; Livorno; Parma
- Matches: 380
- Goals: 991 (2.61 per match)
- Top goalscorer: Luca Toni (31 goals)
- Highest scoring: Roma 4–4 Chievo
- Average attendance: 22,476

The 2005–06 Serie A (known as the Serie A TIM for sponsorship reasons) was the 104th season of top-tier Italian football, the 74th in a round-robin tournament. The league commenced on 28 August 2005 and finished on 14 May 2006. While Juventus were originally the first-placed team, this title was put sub judice due to their involvement in the Calciopoli scandal, with Inter Milan instead declared champions by the Italian Football Federation (FIGC) on 26 July 2006, thus winning the title for the first time in 17 years.

== Rule changes ==
Prior to the 2005–06 season, if two or more teams were tied in points for first place, for only one spot in a European tournament, or in the relegation zone, teams would play tie-breaking matches after the season was over to determine which team would be champion, or be awarded a European tournament spot, or be saved or relegated. However, 2005–06 saw the introduction of new rules. If two or more teams ended the season with the same number of points, the ordering was determined by their head-to-head records. If two or more teams had the same total points and head-to-head records, goal difference became the decisive factor.

== Team details ==
Locations of the 2005–06 Serie A teams

=== Stadiums and locations ===
Club	City	Stadium
Ascoli	Ascoli Piceno	Stadio Cino e Lillo Del Duca
Cagliari	Cagliari	Stadio Sant'Elia
Chievo	Verona	Stadio Marcantonio Bentegodi
Empoli	Empoli	Stadio Carlo Castellani
Fiorentina	Florence	Stadio Artemio Franchi
Inter Milan	Milan	San Siro
Juventus	Turin	Stadio Delle Alpi
Lazio	Rome	Stadio Olimpico
Lecce	Lecce	Stadio Via del mare
Livorno	Livorno	Stadio Armando Picchi
Messina	Messina	Stadio San Filippo
Milan	Milan	San Siro
Palermo	Parma	Stadio Renzo Barbera
Parma	Palermo	Stadio Ennio Tardini
Reggina	Reggio Calabria	Stadio Oreste Granillo
Roma	Rome	Stadio Olimpico
Sampdoria	Genoa	Stadio Luigi Ferraris
Siena	Siena	Stadio Artemio Franchi
Treviso	Treviso	Stadio Omobono Tenni
Udinese	Udine	Stadio Friuli

=== Personnel and sponsoring ===
Team	Head coach	Kit manufacturer	Shirt sponsor
Ascoli	(Italy) Marco Giampaolo	Lotto	Gaudì Jeans/Cult Shoes, Carisap
Cagliari	(Italy) Nedo Sonetti	Asics	Terra Sarda, Sky
Chievo	(Italy) Giuseppe Pillon	Lotto	Paluani/Cattolica Assicurazioni/Ferroli/Banca Popolare di Verona
Empoli	(Italy) Luigi Cagni	Asics	Frutta, Computer Gross
Fiorentina	(Italy) Cesare Prandelli	Lotto	Toyota
Inter Milan	(Italy) Roberto Mancini	Nike	Pirelli
Juventus	(Italy) Fabio Capello	Nike	Tamoil
Lazio	(Italy) Delio Rossi	Puma	INA Assitalia
Lecce	(Italy) Silvio Baldini	Asics	Salento
Livorno	(Italy) Carlo Mazzone	Asics	Banca Carige
Messina	(Italy) Giampiero Ventura	Legea	Caffè Miscela D'Oro, Air Malta
Milan	(Italy) Carlo Ancelotti	Adidas	Opel Zafira
Palermo	(Italy) Giuseppe Papadopulo	Lotto	Provincia di Palermo/Mandi, Provincia di Palermo
Parma	(Italy) Mario Beretta	Champion/Errea	Fidenza Village/Tecnocasa
Reggina	(Italy) Walter Mazzarri	Onze	Gicos, Stocco&Stocco/Regione Calabria
Roma	(Italy) Luciano Spalletti	Diadora	Acqua Fiuggi/Banca Italease
Sampdoria	(Italy) Walter Novellino	Kappa	Erg/LG Mobile (in UEFA matches)
Siena	(Italy) Luigi De Canio	Mass	Banca Monte dei Paschi di Siena, Quadrifoglio Vita
Treviso	(Italy) Alberto Cavasin	Lotto	Segafredo Zanetti, Provincia di Treviso
Udinese	(Italy) Serse Cosmi	Lotto	Kia Motors

== League table ==
Pos	Team	Pld	W	D	L	GF	GA	GD	Pts	Qualification or relegation
1	Inter Milan (C)	38	23	7	8	68	30	+38	76	Qualification to Champions League group stage
2	Roma	38	19	12	7	70	42	+28	69	Qualification to Champions League group stage
3	Milan (Note: Milan, Fiorentina and Lazio were docked 30 points, all for involvement in the Calciopoli.)	38	28	4	6	85	31	+54	58	Qualification to Champions League third qualifying round
4	Chievo	38	13	15	10	54	49	+5	54	Qualification to Champions League third qualifying round
5	Palermo	38	13	13	12	50	52	−2	52	Qualification to UEFA Cup first round
6	Livorno	38	12	13	13	37	44	−7	49	Qualification to UEFA Cup first round
7	Parma (Note: Parma gained entry to the 2006–07 UEFA Cup because 2005–06 Coppa Italia finalists Inter and Roma qualified to the 2006–07 UEFA Champions League and 2006–07 UEFA Cup through their respective championship positions. The final positions of Parma and Empoli were decided by head-to-head record.)	38	12	9	17	46	60	−14	45	Qualification to UEFA Cup first round
8	Empoli	38	13	6	19	47	61	−14	45	
9	Fiorentina	38	22	8	8	66	41	+25	44	
10	Ascoli	38	9	16	13	43	53	−10	43	
11	Udinese	38	11	10	17	40	54	−14	43	
12	Sampdoria	38	10	11	17	47	51	−4	41	
13	Reggina	38	11	8	19	39	65	−26	41	
14	Cagliari	38	8	15	15	42	55	−13	39	
15	Siena	38	9	12	17	42	60	−18	39	
16	Lazio	38	16	14	8	57	47	+10	32	
17	Messina (Note: Messina were reprieved from relegation following Juventus's punishment.)	38	6	13	19	33	59	−26	31	
18	Lecce (R)	38	7	8	23	30	57	−27	29	Relegation to Serie B
19	Treviso (R)	38	3	12	23	24	56	−32	21	Relegation to Serie B
20	Juventus (Note: Juventus were originally the first-placed team, but the title was put sub judice due to the Calciopoli scandal. After court hearings, Juventus were placed at the bottom of the league table (points were not deducted), relegating them to Serie B, while the title was assigned to Internazionale, the team taking the first place in the end.) (D, R)	38	27	10	1	71	24	+47	91	Placed last, relegation to Serie B and disqualified from the Champions League group stage

Source: 2005–06 Serie A, Soccerway
Rules for classification: 1) points; 2) goal difference; 3) number of goals scored.
(C) Champions; (D) Disqualified; (R) Relegated

== Results ==
Home \ Away	ASC	CAG	CHV	EMP	FIO	INT	JUV	LAZ	LCE	LIV	MES	MIL	PAL	PAR	REG	ROM	SAM	SIE	TRV	UDI
Ascoli		2–2	2–2	3–1	0–2	1–2	1–3	1–4	2–0	0–0	1–0	1–1	1–1	3–1	1–1	3–2	2–1	1–1	1–0	1–1
Cagliari	2–1		2–2	4–1	0–0	2–2	1–1	1–1	0–0	1–1	1–1	0–2	1–1	3–1	0–2	0–0	2–0	1–0	0–0	2–1
Chievo	1–1	2–1		2–2	0–2	0–1	1–1	2–2	3–1	2–1	2–0	2–1	0–0	1–0	4–0	4–4	1–1	4–1	0–0	2–0
Empoli	1–2	3–1	2–1		1–1	1–0	0–4	2–3	1–0	2–1	1–3	1–3	0–1	1–2	3–0	1–0	2–1	2–1	1–1	1–1
Fiorentina	3–1	2–1	2–1	2–1		2–1	1–2	1–2	1–0	3–2	2–0	3–1	1–0	4–1	5–2	1–1	2–1	2–1	1–0	4–2
Inter Milan	1–0	3–2	1–0	4–1	1–0		1–2	3–1	3–0	5–0	3–0	3–2	3–0	2–0	4–0	2–3	1–0	1–1	3–0	3–1
Juventus	2–1	4–0	1–0	2–1	1–1	2–0		1–1	3–1	3–0	1–0	0–0	2–1	1–1	1–0	1–1	2–0	2–0	3–1	1–0
Lazio	4–1	1–1	2–2	3–3	1–0	0–0	1–1		1–0	3–1	1–0	0–0	4–2	1–0	3–1	0–2	2–0	3–2	3–1	1–1
Lecce	0–0	3–0	0–0	1–2	1–3	0–2	0–3	0–0		0–0	0–2	1–0	2–0	1–2	0–0	2–2	0–3	3–0	1–1	1–2
Livorno	2–0	0–1	0–0	2–0	2–0	0–0	1–3	2–1	2–1		2–2	0–3	3–1	2–0	1–0	0–0	0–0	2–2	1–1	0–2
Messina	1–1	1–0	2–0	0–3	2–2	1–2	2–2	1–1	2–1	0–0		1–3	0–0	0–1	1–1	0–2	1–4	0–0	3–1	1–1
Milan	1–0	1–0	4–1	3–0	3–1	1–0	3–1	2–0	2–1	2–0	4–0		2–1	4–3	2–1	2–1	1–1	3–1	5–0	5–1
Palermo	1–1	2–2	2–2	2–2	1–0	3–2	1–2	3–1	3–0	0–2	1–0	0–2		4–2	1–0	3–3	0–2	1–3	1–0	2–0
Parma	0–0	1–0	2–1	1–0	2–4	1–0	1–2	1–1	2–0	2–1	1–1	2–3	1–1		4–0	0–3	1–1	1–1	1–1	1–2
Reggina	2–0	3–1	1–3	0–2	1–1	0–4	0–2	1–0	2–0	1–1	3–0	1–4	2–2	2–1		0–3	2–1	1–1	1–2	2–0
Roma	2–1	4–3	4–0	1–0	1–1	1–1	1–4	1–1	3–1	3–0	2–1	1–0	1–2	4–1	3–1		0–0	2–3	1–0	0–1
Sampdoria	1–2	1–1	1–2	2–0	3–1	2–2	0–1	2–0	1–3	0–2	4–2	2–1	0–2	1–2	3–2	1–1		3–3	1–1	1–1
Siena	1–1	2–1	0–1	1–0	0–2	0–0	0–3	2–3	1–2	0–0	4–2	0–3	1–2	2–2	0–0	0–2	1–0		1–0	2–3
Treviso	2–2	1–2	1–2	1–2	1–3	0–1	0–0	0–1	2–1	0–1	0–0	0–2	2–2	0–1	0–1	0–1	0–2	0–1		2–1
Udinese	1–1	2–0	1–1	1–0	0–0	0–1	0–1	3–0	1–2	0–2	1–0	0–4	0–0	2–0	1–2	1–4	2–0	1–2	2–2	

Source: lega-calcio.it (in Italian)
Legend: Blue = home team win; Yellow = draw; Red = away team win.

== Top goalscorers ==
The Capocannoniere (top scorer) of 2005–06 was Luca Toni of Fiorentina. His 31 goals was the highest tally since Antonio Valentín Angelillo scored 33 for Inter Milan in 1958–59.

Rank	Player	Club	Goals
1	(Italy) Luca Toni	Fiorentina	31
2	(France) David Trezeguet	Juventus	23
3	(Honduras) David Suazo	Cagliari	22
4	(Italy) Cristiano Lucarelli	Livorno	19
4	(Italy) Francesco Tavano	Empoli	19
4	(Ukraine) Andriy Shevchenko	Milan	19
7	(Italy) Alberto Gilardino	Milan	17
8	(Italy) Tommaso Rocchi	Lazio	16
9	(Argentina) Julio Cruz	Inter Milan	15
9	(Italy) Francesco Totti	Roma	15

== Transfer ==
- Summer Transfer
- Winter Transfer
- co-ownership
- co-ownership

== Attendances ==
#	Club	Avg. attendance	Highest
1	AC Milan	59,993	79,706
2	Internazionale	51,371	78,606
3	Roma	39,726	68,816
4	Fiorentina	33,044	43,950
5	Juventus	30,469	56,488
6	Palermo	27,924	33,149
7	Lazio	27,872	60,040
8	Sampdoria	22,688	35,369
9	Messina	20,975	30,550
10	Udinese	16,447	21,596
11	Parma	14,372	23,116
12	Reggina	12,552	40,000
13	Lecce	12,495	24,941
14	Livorno	12,489	16,304
15	Ascoli	11,154	22,919
16	Cagliari	10,475	25,134
17	Siena	8,724	15,007
18	Chievo	8,589	26,289
19	Empoli	6,725	13,454
20	Treviso	5,885	17,389

== See also ==
- 2005–06 Serie B
- 2005–06 Coppa Italia
