= Nexi =

Italian multinational financial technology company

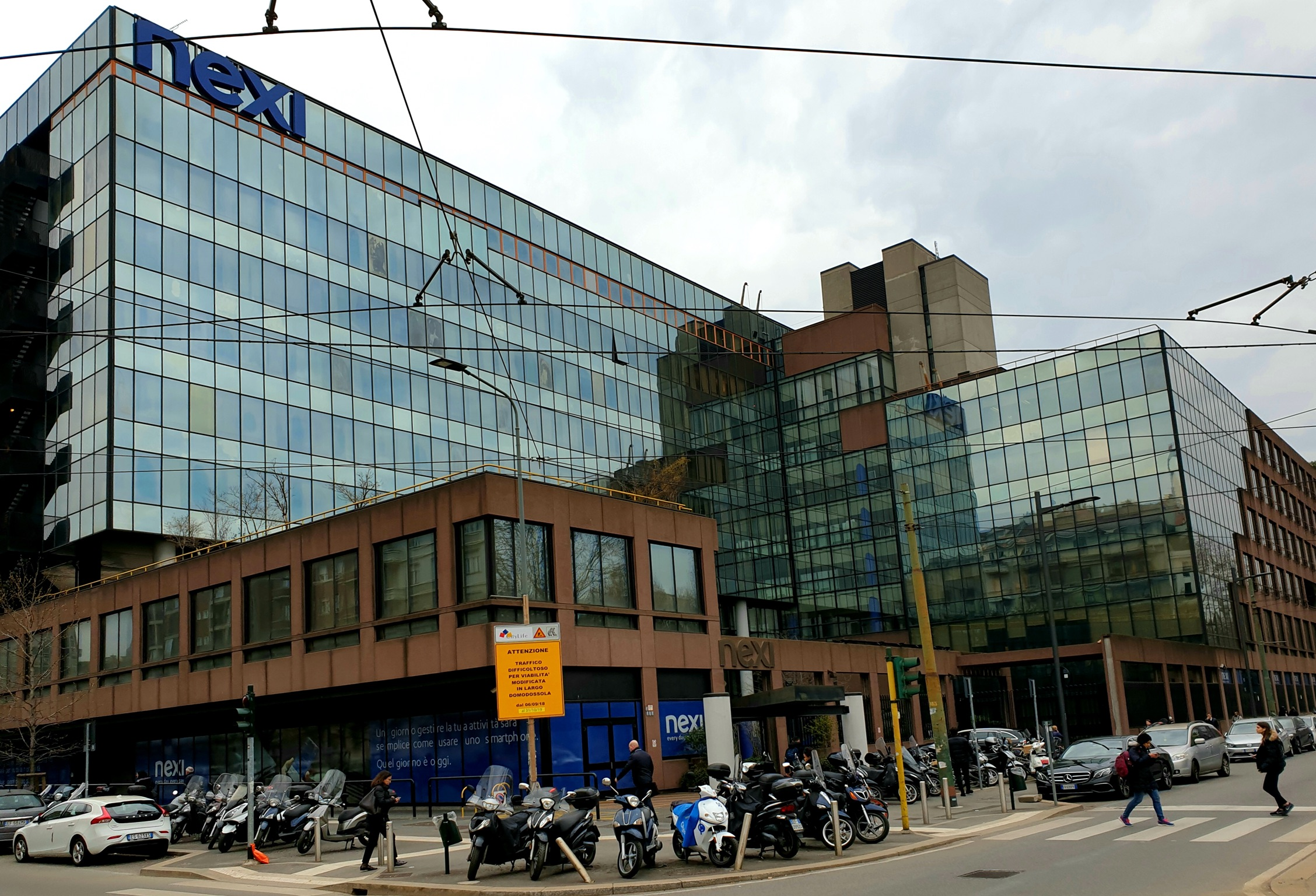
- Formerly: Istituto Centrale delle Banche Popolari Italiane
- Type: Public (Società per azioni)
- Traded as: BIT: NEXI; FTSE MIB component
- ISIN: IT0005366767
- Industry: Financial technology
- Founded: 1939; 87 years ago
- Headquarters: Milan, Italy
- Key people: Bernardo Mingrone (CEO); Enrico Marchini (CFO)
- Products: Merchants and Financials Services
- Revenue: ▲$3.514 billion (2024)
- Net income: ▲$167.4 million (2024)
- Number of employees: 10,580 (2024)
Rating
BBB-	(Fitch, 2024)
Ba1	(Moody's, 2025
BBB-	S&P, 2025)
- Website: www.nexigroup.com

Nexi S.p.A., formerly known as Istituto Centrale delle Banche Popolari Italiane S.p.A. (ICBPI), is an Italian company that offers digital payment services and infrastructure for banks, companies, institutions, and public administrations.

== History ==
The Istituto Centrale delle Banche Popolari Italiane (ICBPI) was founded in 1939 by Banca Popolare di Cremona, Banca Popolare di Intra, Banca Popolare di Lecco, Banca Popolare di Lodi, Banca Popolare di Luino e di Varese and Banca Popolare di Verona. Its purpose was to strengthen and coordinate the activities of the Italian banks and to provide support services for their activities. Over time, its shareholding expanded to include all Italian banks.

In 2006, ICBPI acquired Key Client Cards & Solutions, a spin-off of Deutsche Bank. Since January 28, 2008, the Automated Clearing House – ACH SEPA Compliant with ICCREA Banca has been activated. On 15 September 2008, ICBPI signed an agreement with Equens SE in Vienna for the establishment of the Equens Italia joint venture, which will carry out the Automated Clearing House activity in Italy as insourcer of ICBPI and ICCREA.

At the end of 2008, the process of acquiring a majority stake in S.I. Holding (which fully controls CartaSi S.p.A., Si Servizi S.p.A., Si Call S.p.A., Carta Facile S.p.A., CartaSi Capital S.p.A., and SiRe Business Services LTD) began. The acquisition was successfully completed in June 2009, with the necessary authorizations obtained from the Autorità Garante della Concorrenza e del Mercato and Bank of Italy.

In September 2010, the formalization of an agreement for the purchase of the custodian bank business from Banca Carige was announced for 19.5 million euro. In November 2010, the acquisition of the custodian bank activity from Banca Sella was announced, which at the same time became a shareholder of ICBPI with a 0.96% stake. In November 2010, the ICBPI was condemned by the Antitrust to pay a fine of 490,000 euros for agreements restricting competition in relation to the credit card sector, which was subsequently suspended by the Tribunale Amministrativo Regionale (TAR) of Lazio.

As of January 2015, Credito Valtellinese (Creval) was the main shareholder with a 20.39% stake. In June 2015, ICBPI was acquired by Mercury Italy S.r.l. (a consortium of Advent International, Bain Capital, and Clessidra SGR) for €2.15 billion. On 23 June 2015, the investment managers incorporated a SPV "MERCURY BONDCO PLC" to issue securities to raise debt, in order to lend to sister companies: Mercury A Capital Limited, Mercury B Capital Limited and Mercury ABC Capital Limited, the parent companies of Mercury UK Holdco Limited, which in turn the parent company of ICBPI. On 18 December 2015, the shares held by Creval (18.39%), Banco Popolare (13.88%), Banca Popolare di Vicenza (9.99%), Veneto Banca (9.99%), Banca Popolare dell'Emilia Romagna (9.14%), ICCREA Holding (7.42%), Banca Popolare di Cividale (4.44%), UBI Banca (4.04%), Banca Popolare di Milano (4.00%), Banca Carige (2.20%), Banca Sella Holding (1.80%) and some minor banks were sold to an intermediate holding company Mercury Italy S.r.l.

On 29 December 2016, Mercury Italy S.r.l was merged with ICBPI, which Mercury UK Holdco Limited (parent of Mercury Italy S.r.l) became the new parent company of the ICBPI. Also in 2016, ICBPI acquired Intesa Sanpaolo's subsidiaries Setefi and Intesa Sanpaolo Card for €1.03 billion: this included Intesa Sanpaolo's entire portfolio of credit and prepaid cards (€15 million), the affiliated merchants (400,000) and the related issuing, acquiring and processing activities. In February 2017, ICPBI acquired the card business of Banca Monte dei Paschi di Siena for €520 million.

=== Rebranding ===
In November 2017, the company was renamed to Nexi, while its card business was renamed from CartaSi to Nexi Payments. On 5 October 2020, it was announced Nexi would merge with SIA S.p.A., thus creating one of Europe's largest fintech groups. In 2020, the main shareholder was Hellman & Friedman (19.92%) which acquired the stake with the contribution of Nets. On 16 June 2021, a merger with the Danish company Nets was signed, which resulted in Nexi expanding its range of action at a European level. On 30 July 2021, Nexi reached a market capitalization of $23.28 billion. On 15 October 2021, The Autorità Garante della Concorrenza e del Mercato approved the merger of SIA S.p.A. into Nexi S.p.A.

On 25 October 2023, Nexi lost 13% in the trading day, the collapse of Worldline, Nexi's competitor, which lost 60%, was an accomplice to the collapse. On 19 July 2024, UniCredit sold up to 1.1% of Nexi's capital as part of a Nexi shareholder restructuring. It sold 14.7 million Nexi shares for a price of €5.735. On 19 July 2024, Nexi shares closed the trading day at a price of €5.656 with a loss of -3.81%. On 13 June 2025, Mercury UK Holdco Limited further reduced its shareholding in Nexi to 3,010%. On 10 September 2025, Barclays reduced its price target for Nexi shares, resulting in a sharp drop of -9.45%, closing the trading day at a price of €4.734. Barclays justified its financial analysis report on Nexi by highlighting the potential for reduced growth prospects due to increasing competition from existing and new competitors in the digital payments market. However, some financial analysts believe this analysis is not entirely correct, and found the publication on 10 September 2025, the same day of the IPO of Klarna on the New York Stock Exchange, a direct competitor of Nexi, to be somewhat artful.

On 3 October 2025, JPMorgan analysts reduced their price target on the stock, with a "Neutral" recommendation on the stock. On 5 November 2025, Nexi's EBITDA continued to be impacted by corporate inefficiency costs. From the first nine months of 2024 to the first nine months of 2025, EBITDA growth was only 3.5%. Digital Banking Solutions was negative for -0.7%. On 17 September 2025, it was announced that Nexi Group, will become full ownership of Computop Paygate GmbH. Since 1 January 2023 Nexi Group held a 30 percent stake in the German Payment Service Provider Computop Paygate GmbH. Computop will still be a stand-alone company within the Nexi Group. On 20 January 2026, Mercury UK reduced its stake to almost zero, from 3.010% in June 2025 to 0.011%. On 28 January 2026, Nexi had a market capitalization of $5.08 billion. As January 2026, the continued decline in Nexi's share price had been due to corporate inefficiencies that have led to increased debt, partly due to M&A transactions and partly to poor corporate operations. In fact, it is precisely to resolve these problems that are plaguing the company that Piergiorgio Pedron has been appointed CFO, who will take up the role starting in April 2026. In March 2026, the company announced that CEO Paolo Bertoluzzo would be replaced by Nexi Payments executive Bernardo Mingrone. A major NGO Free Software Foundation Europe claims its was evicted by Nexi, without prior notice.

== Shareholders ==
As of 27 May 2025, Nexi's main shareholders were:

Shareholder	% of Capital
Evergood H&F Lux S.à.r.l	21.19 %
Cassa Depositi e Prestiti S.p.A.	18.25 %
Mercury UK Holdco Limited	9.86 %
Eagle	6.47 %
AB Europe Investment S.à.r.l	2.14 %
Neptune BC	1.15 %
Other Shareholders	40.94 %

As of 25 January 2026, Nexi's main shareholders were:

Shareholder	% of Capital
Evergood H&F Lux S.à.r.l	20.298 %
Cassa Depositi e Prestiti S.p.A.	19.143 %
Eagle	6.085 %
