= Banca Akros =

- Company type: Subsidiary
- Industry: Financial services
- Founded: 1997; 28 years ago
- Headquarters: Milan, Italy
- Area served: Italy
- Key people: Marco Turrina (CEO), Graziano Tarantini (Chairman)
- Products: Investing, trading
- Parent: Banco BPM
- Website: www.bancaakros.it

Banca Akros is an Italian investment bank based in Milan. It is a subsidiary of the Italian bank, Banco BPM.

== History ==
Banca Akros was founded by Gianmario Roveraro in Milan in 1997.

In 1998, Banca Akros became part of Banca Popolare di Milano. After the 2017 merger of Banco Popolare di Milano with Banco Popolare, Banca Akros became part of the Banco BPM group.
