= Südtiroler Sparkasse – Cassa di Risparmio di Bolzano =

Sparkasse – Cassa di Risparmio
- Native name: Südtiroler Sparkasse; Cassa di Risparmio di Bolzano
- Company type: Aktiengesellschaft; Società per Azioni
- Industry: Financial services
- Founded: 1854
- Headquarters: Bolzano, Italy
- Number of locations: 106 branches (2018)
- Area served: South Tyrol; Trentino, Lombardy, Veneto & Friuli; & Germany (Munich)
- Services: retail and corporate banking
- Net income: ▼ (€29 million) (2016)
- Total assets: ▲€8.429 billion (2016)
- Total equity: ▼€730 million (2016)
- Owner: Stiftung Südtiroler Sparkasse (66.02%)
- Capital ratio: 11.02% (CET1)
- Footnotes / references in consolidated financial statement

The Savings Bank of the Province of Bolzano / South Tyrol (German: Südtiroler Sparkasse A.G., Italian: Cassa di Risparmio di Bolzano S.p.A.) is an Italian savings bank based in Bolzano, the capital of South Tyrol autonomous region.

Due to Italian banking reform, the bank was separate into a S.p.A. and a banking foundation (Stiftung Südtiroler Sparkasse – Fondazione Cassa di Risparmio di Bolzano) in 1992.

Banca Popolare di Lodi (BPL) was a minority shareholders of the bank, which Reti Bancarie acted as a sub-holding company for 19.99%. In 2006 Reti Bancarie was absorbed into BPL, as well as the bank sold 10% back to the banking foundation of the savings bank. On 20 December 2007 the remaining 9.99% was sold by Banco Popolare to the foundation.

As at 31 December 2014 the banking foundation owned 66.02% stake of the bank; among other investors, Banca Popolare di Puglia e Basilicata owned 0.07% stake. In 2020 Sparkasse continues the decrease in risks expressed by the net Npl ratio indicator which reaches the level of 1.8% compared to 2.3% in 2019.

== See also ==
- List of banks in the euro area
- List of banks in Italy

== See also ==
- Angonese v Cassa di Risparmio di Bolzano SpA
- Raiffeisen Landesbank Südtirol – Cassa Centrale Raiffeisen dell'Alto Adige another South Tyrol bank
- Südtiroler Volksbank – Banca Popolare dell'Alto Adige another South Tyrol bank
