= Banca Popolare di Mantova =

- Native name: Banca Popolare di Mantova S.p.A.
- Company type: Subsidiary
- Industry: Financial services
- Predecessor: Banca Operaia di Pescopagano
- Founded: 2000; 25 years ago in Mantua
- Defunct: 31 December 2016
- Fate: became SPV to create BPM S.p.A.
- Successor: Banca Popolare di Milano S.p.A.
- Headquarters: 7 Piazza Martiri di Belfiore, Mantua, Italy
- Number of locations: 17 (2015)
- Services: Retail banking
- Revenue: ▲17.519 million (2015)
- Net income: ▲€1.313 million (2015)
- Total assets: ▲€552.423 million (2015)
- Total equity: ▲€36.670 million (2015)
- Owner: Banca Popolare di Milano (62.91%); Omniaholding (14.86%); Zanetti family (13.26%); Corneliani (1.92%); others (7.05%)
- Number of employees: ▲78 (2015)
- Parent: Banca Popolare di Milano S.c. a r.l.
- Capital ratio: ▲9.45% (CET1)
- Footnotes / references source

Banca Popolare di Mantova S.p.A. was an Italian cooperative bank based in Mantua, Lombardy. Including the headquarters, the bank operated at 17 locations.

== History ==
The company was relocated from Pescopagano, Basilicata (as Banca Operaia di Pescopagano) to Mantua in 2000, which the branches of the original bank were acquired by Banca Bipielle Centrosud, a subsidiary of Banca Popolare di Lodi (BPL Group). In 2001 the bank increased to have 4 branches. The year BPL owned 57.41% shares directly. In 2002 Bipielle Retail became the sub-holding company for 56.35%, as well as one more branch was opened. In 2003 Reti Bancarie absorbed Bipielle Retail to become another sub-holding company. In 2004 BPL further disinvested the company to 52.32%, despite 2 more branches being opened. In 2005 BP Mantova had 8 branches. In 2006 Reti Bancarie was absorbed into BPL, which hold 55.01% shares of BP Mantova. In 2007 due to the merger of Banco Popolare di Verona e Novara and BPL, Banco Popolare S.C. became the new holding company of the bank. However, due to the branch network overlapped with Banca Popolare di Verona – S.Geminiano e S.Prospero, Banco Popolare sold 56.99% shares of BP Mantova to Banca Popolare di Milano for €32.49 million in 2008.

In 2009, BPM held 57.05% shares, with Omniaholding S.p.A. as the second largest shareholders of 13.8979%, which was the holding company for the Roberto Colaninno family.

Follow the merger of parent company Banca Popolare di Milano S.c. a r.l. with Banco Popolare S.C. to form Banco BPM S.p.A., the branches of Banca Popolare di Milano were injected to Banca Popolare di Mantova in order to keep the branches as a subsidiary (as Banca Popolare di Milano S.p.A.) instead of division.

== See also ==
- Banca Agricola Mantovana
- List of banks in Italy
