= Deutsche Bank (Italy) =

Bank subsidiary in Italy

- Native name: Deutsche Bank S.p.A.
- Formerly: Banca dell'Italia Meridionale; Banca d'America e d'Italia
- Type: Società per Azioni
- Industry: Financial services
- Founded: 1917; 1922 (acquired by Bank of America); 1986 (acquired by Deutsche Bank)
- Headquarters: 3 Piazza del Calendario, Milan, Italy
- Net income: ▲€62.810 million (2014)
- Total assets: €30.870 billion (2024)
- Total equity: ▲€1.418 billion (2014)
- Owner: Deutsche Bank (100%)
- Parent: Deutsche Bank
- Subsidiaries: Deutsche Bank Mutui (100%); Fiduciaria Sant'Andrea (100%); Finanza & Futuro Banca (100%); Vesta Real Estate (100%); DB Consorzio S.cons.a.r.l. (98%); DB Covered Bond S.r.l. (90%)
- Capital ratio: ▲8.53% (CET1)
- Website: Official website

Deutsche Bank S.p.A. is an Italian bank based in Milan, Lombardy. It is a subsidiary of Deutsche Bank A.G.

== History ==
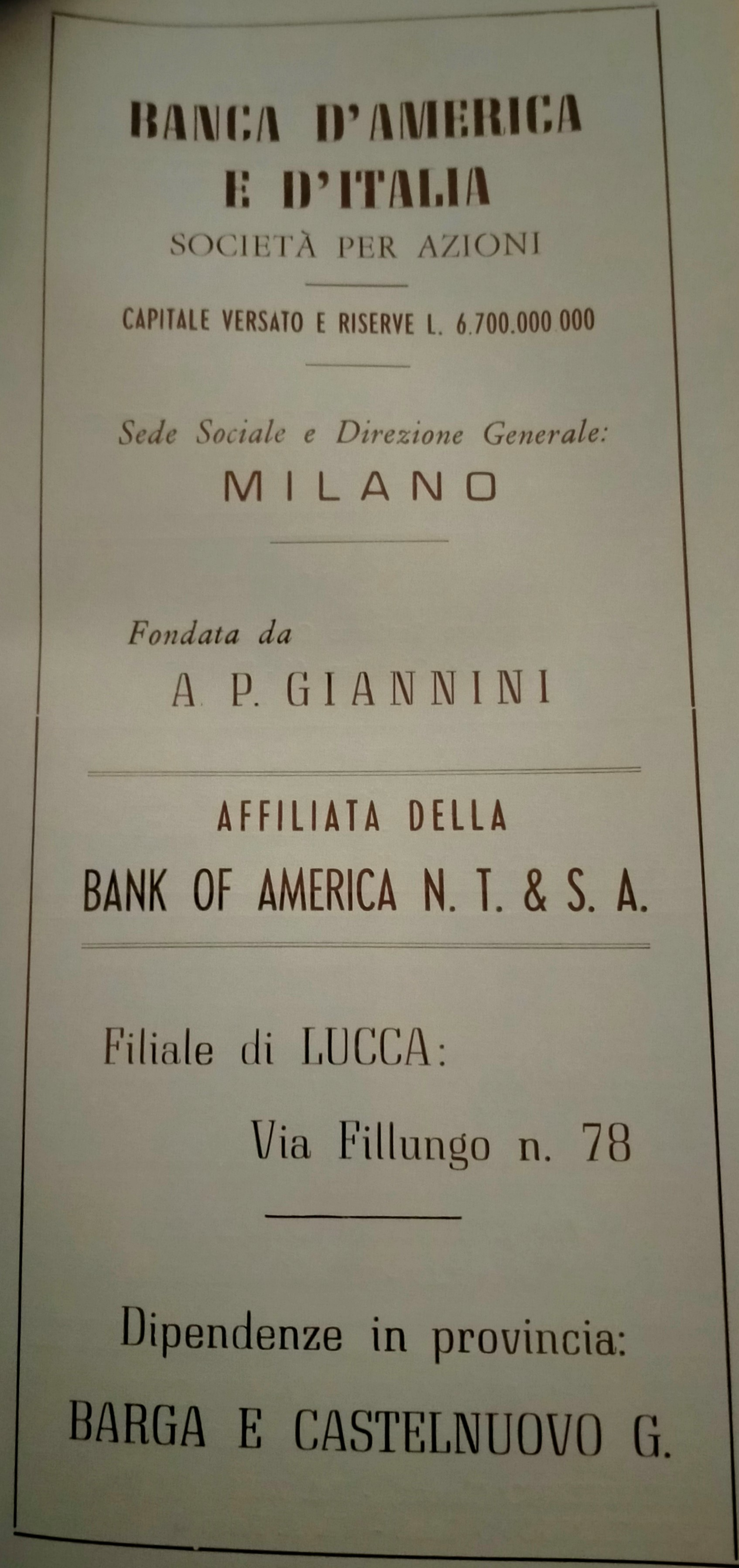
Advertisement of the Lucca branches of the Bank of America and Italy, 1962

Banca dell'Italia Meridionale was found in 1917. It was acquired by Amadeo Giannini, the founder of Bank of Italy (United States) in 1922. The bank was renamed to Banca d'America e d'Italia (literally the Bank of America and Italy). In December 1986 Deutsche Bank acquired 98.3% voting rights of the bank. In 1994 the bank was renamed to Deutsche Bank S.p.A..

In 1994 the DB Italy also acquired Banca Popolare di Lecco. In 1999 DB Italy acquired 20% shares of Cassa di Risparmio di Asti which was sold to Banca Popolare di Milano in 2004. From 2000 to 2003 the bank also had a minority interests in Banca di Cividale.
