= Anima Holding =

Italian asset management company

Anima Holding SpA
- Formerly: Anima Holding SpA
- Type: Public company
- Traded as: BIT: ANIM; FTSE Italia Mid Cap Component
- Industry: Investment Management
- Founded: July 5, 1983; 43 years ago
- Founder: Alberto Foà
- Headquarters: Milan, Italy
- Key people: Maria Patrizia Grieco (Chairman); Saverio Perissinotto (CEO; Managing Director)
- Net income: €266 million (2025)
- AUM: €212 billion (December 2025)
- Number of employees: >500 (2025)
- Website: www.animasgr.it

Anima Holding SpA (Anima) is an Italian asset management company headquartered in Milan. It is currently publicly traded on the Borsa Italiana and is a constituent member of the FTSE Italia Mid Cap index. It is the largest independent investment manager in Italy.

== History ==
The company was originally founded on 5 July 1983, under the name Sogestim SpA. On 19 September 1994 Alberto Foà and several other partners took over the company and renamed it to Anima SGRpA.

In 1999, Anima was taken over by Banco di Desio e della Brianza (BDB). In March 2004, some of Anima's shares were sold to Koinè, a company controlled by Anima's management team.

In October 2005, Anima held its initial public offering (IPO) and was listed on the Borsa Italiana.

In 2007, Banca Popolare di Milano (BPM) acquired BDB's stake of Anima and in 2008, launched a takeover bid to acquire all of Anima's shares for €1.45 per share. Following this, on 3 March 2009, Anima was delisted from the Borsa Italiana.

On 28 September 2009, Anima was merged with Bipiemme Gestioni SGR SpA, the savings management company of BPM. The new company formed was named Anima SGR SpA.

In April 2010, Anima acquired Etruria Fund Management Company from Banca Etruria for €6.3 million.

In July 2010, it was announced that Anima would merge with Prima SGR, a rival investment management firm. In December 2011, the merger was complete with the new entity being formed named Anima SGR and was under the control of AM Holding (Asset Management Holding which was later renamed to Anima Holding). Through AM Holding, the main shareholders of Anima were Clessidra (38.1%), BPM (36.3%) and Banca Monte dei Paschi di Siena (MPS) (23.4%). At this point, Anima was the largest independent investment management company with €34.7 billion in assets under management.

In early 2014, Anima prepared for its IPO to list on the Borsa Italiana as Anima Holding. On 16 April that year, Anima listed on the Borsa Italiana raising €692 million.

On 15 April 2015, it was announced Poste Italiane would purchase MPS' stake of Anima in a €215.2 million deal. In December 2017, Anima and Poste Italiane signed an agreement to help develop Poste Italiane's asset management activities.

In August 2017, it was agreed that Anima would acquire rival investment management firm, Aletti Gestielle from BPM for €700 million.

In October 2022, it was reported that the Italian government wanted to keep ownership of Anima in domestic hands and backed Poste Italiane to increase its holdings in Anima. Back in May that year, Amundi acquired a stake in Anima which sparked concerns about expansion plans from foreign entities. At that time, Anima closed its operations in Dublin, Ireland and relocated it staff back to Milan.

In February 2023, private equity firm, Fondo Strategico Italiano acquired a 9% stake of Anima. Around the same time Anima came to an agreement to acquire 80% of alternative investment firm, Castello SGR from Oaktree Capital Management for €60 million.

In November 2023, Anima signed a deal to acquire Italian investment manager, Kairos from Julius Baer Group for €20-25 million.

In November 2024, Banco BPM initiated a takeover bid for Anima Holding and announced that it plans to launch a voluntary tender offer for the remaining shares of Anima Holding it did not already own (22%). Banco BPM launched its buyout offer in March 2025, at a price of €7 per share, for an overall amount of €1.55 billion and, by the beginning of April 2025, Banco BPM's stake in Anima reached 90%, thus granting the Italian Bank the control of Anima.

Since February 2026, Saverio Perissinotto has been the Chief Executive Officer and General Manager of Anima Holding.
