= Gianmario Roveraro =

Italian high jumper and banker (1936–2006)

- Born: 24 May 1936; Albenga (Kingdom of Italy)
- Died: 5 July 2006 (aged 70); Parma (Italy)

Gianmario Roveraro (24 May 1936 - 5 July 2006) was an Italian high jumper, who was the first Italian athlete to jump over 2 metres barrier, and a banker, who founded Akros Finanziaria.

== Biography ==
As a young man he was a brilliant sportsman. He was national champion in high jump on three occasions (1954, 1955, 1956), improving to three times the record of Italian specialties, the first Italian over 2.00 m, he participated in the 1956 Summer Olympics in Melbourne, where he placed 23rd.

=== Banking ===
After graduating in economics, he began his banking career in 1961. Five years later, he moved to Sige, to work for the IMI group, introducing the world first Italian financial instruments, such as investment funds.

He was for many years president of the Fondazione Rui istituzione che sovraintende ai collegi universitari dell'Opera.

In 1987 he founded Akros, after disagreements occurred the previous year in Sige, Akros became a major Italian merchant bank, in those years he collaborated with the Cirio Sergio Cragnotti and was architect of Parmalat's placement on the Stock Exchange of Calisto Tanzi.

Mr. Roveraro had been questioned in an investigation into the financial collapse and bankruptcy fraud of food and dairy giant Parmalat, which is based in Parma, Italy. In 2003 the Parmalat company collapsed with more than $14 billion Euros in debt. (Europe's biggest corporate failure)

== Disappearance ==
He went missing on 5 July 2006 following an Opus Dei meeting of prayer and spiritual formation. It is thought that he was kidnapped, although no ransom was made. He contacted his family twice: once to call his wife and tell her he had to resolve an issue in Austria and later to request 1 million euros. He was interviewed about the collapse of Italian food giant Parmalat, following its collapse in 2003.

His badly beaten body was found near Parma on 21 July 2006. Police suspect the murder may be related to a business deal and three suspects were arrested.

== National titles ==
- Italian Athletics Championships
  - High jump: 1954, 1955, 1956 (3)

== See also ==
- Men's high jump Italian record progression
- Roberto Calvi
- Ettore Gotti Tedeschi
