= Alberto Foà =

Italian businessman (born 1957)

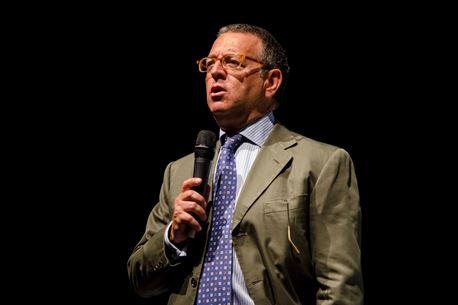
- Alberto Foà
- Born: 28 December 1957 (age 68); Milan, Italy
- Citizenship: Italy
- Occupations: Founder; President
- Title: Founder and President of AcomeA SGR

Alberto Foà (born December 28, 1957, in Milan, Italy) is an Italian company manager, founder and president of AcomeA SGR.

== Biography ==
=== Education and first professional responsibilities ===
After graduating at the Bocconi University of Milan, Alberto Foà won the “Giorgio Mortara” scholarship from the Bank of Italy. He completed an educational experience abroad, earning a PhD at the Johns Hopkins University in Baltimore. His professional career started in Chase Econometrics and in the Bank of Italy’s Study Department, before working as a bond & swap trader for Citibank. From 1988 to 1994 he held the positions of bond fund manager and head of strategy for Finanza e Futuro Fondi Sprind.

=== Anima SGR ===
In 1994 Alberto Foà founded the independent asset management operator Anima SGR, holding the positions of CEO and head of investments. In the same period he was also a member of the executive and steering committee of Assogestioni.

=== AcomeA SGR ===
In 2010 Alberto Foà founded AcomeA SGR together with Giovanni Brambilla, Roberto Brasca, and Giordano Martinelli, taking over the asset management company “Sai Asset Management” from the Fondiaria Group. In 2013, 2014 and 2018, AcomeA SGR ranked first as the best Italian Management Company in the “small” category of the Premio Alto Rendimento, a recognition given by the “Il Sole 24 Ore”. The company ranked second in 2017, and third in 2015 and 2016.

=== Other responsibilities ===
Alberto Foà is also council member of the Pier Lombardo Foundation.
