= SIA S.p.A. =

- Type: Private
- Industry: Payments
- Founded: 1977
- Headquarters: Milan, Italy
- Number of locations: Rome, Turin, Parma, Macerata, Verona, Utrecht, Zaventem, London, Frankfurt am Main, Bucharest, Pretoria, Vienna
- Services: Card processing, e-payments, network services, financial markets platforms
- Revenue: €748.2 million
- Number of employees: 3,660
- Website: www.sia.eu/en

SIA S.p.A. is an Italian company operating in the area of ICT, providing services to the banking and finance sector in addition to platforms for financial markets and e-payment services.

== History ==
The company was founded in 1977 as Società Interbancaria per l'Automazione by Banca d'Italia, ABI and a pool of Italian banks. During the 1980s, SIA created the Rete Nazionale Interbancaria (RNI – national interbank network) and contributed to developing the interbank payments system in compliance with the white paper on payment systems in Italy, published by Banca d’Italia in 1987.

In 1983 SIA launched Bancomat and in 1987 introduced POS payments.

In 1992, from a branch of SIA's business, SSB - Società per i Servizi Bancari was born, a firm specializing in services in the field of electronic money. The new company worked on further developments in payment cards: Bancomat/Pagobancomat, FASTpay, borsellino elettronico (e-purse with the MINIpay product) and the Microcircuito project for the migration from magnetic stripe cards to microchip cards.

In 1999, SIA merged with Cedborsa, changing its name to "Società Interbancaria per l'Automazione - Cedborsa S.p.A.", working on the automation of the Borsa Italiana markets and the launch of the Italian gross payments markets e-MID and MTS.

In 2003, SIA developed the interbank payments system in Romania, a condition for the country's entry into the European Union.

In the early 2000s, SIA created and managed the technology platform for the STEP2 project, the first continental ACH (automated clearing house) for retail payments in euros.

In the same period, SIA created RTGS (Real Time Gross Settlement System) platforms for the central banks of Sweden, Norway, Egypt and Palestine.

In May 2007, the merger between SIA and SSB gave birth to SIA-SSB S.p.A., a name simplified in 2011 to SIA S.p.A.

In 2012, in partnership with Colt, SIA was awarded the tender announced by the European Central Bank and becomes a licensed Network Service Provider appointed to create the network infrastructure connecting central securities depositaries (CSD), central banks in the Eurosystem and major bank groups at European level to TARGET2-Securities (T2S).

A year later, together with the same partner, SIA won the tender announced by Deutsche Bundesbank (which was also operating on behalf of Banca d’Italia, Banque de France and Banco de España) to create the network infrastructure linking the four central banks charged with managing the single platform of the Eurosystem to settle large payments and securities transactions.

Over the course of 2013, SIA incorporated its Belgian subsidiary SiNSYS, a company operating in the processing of payment cards, and acquired Emmecom, an Italian firm in the sector of fixed, mobile and satellite telecommunications networks.

In the area of mobile payments, during 2014 SIA launched a service called Jiffy for sending and receiving cash in real time to and from a user's contacts by smartphone.

At the end of 2014, SIA incorporated its subsidiary RA Computer and the payments Gateway business of its TSP subsidiary. This led to the direct control of payment institution PI4PAY (effective from July 2011).

In January 2016, SIA acquired 69% of UBIQ, a startup born in 2012 from a spin-off of Parma University, specialized in designing and developing innovative technological solutions, particularly in the field of promotions, where it operates with the brand Ti Frutta.

In April 2016, the Reserve Bank of New Zealand (RBNZ), New Zealand's central bank, chose SIA to develop the new Real-Time Gross Settlement (RTGS) system, to create the new domestic interbank payments system, replacing the Exchange Settlement Account System (ESAS).

On June 2, 2016, SIA and Raphaels Bank, an issuing bank known for enabling innovation in payments, have agreed to a partnership agreement for the development and launch of payment solutions in the UK and throughout Europe.

In August 2016, ČSOB, one of the largest commercial banks in the Czech Republic and part of the Belgian KBC Group, and SIA launched the first mobile wallet for NFC payments in the Czech Republic that supports both the MasterCard and VISA circuits.

During the same month, Unicredit Business Integrated Solutions (UBIS), a company in the Unicredit Group, and SIA signed an agreement for the sale to the latter – for the sum of €500 million – of the processing activities of around 13.5 million payment cards and the management of 206,000 POS terminals and 12,000 ATMs in Italy, Germany and Austria. UBIS also signed with SIA a ten-year outsourcing contract for the supply of processing services for transactions made using debit, credit and prepaid cards, and for the management of POS and ATM terminals.

In the final part of 2016, SIA launched a series of partnerships in the e-payments market: American Express Italia has chosen SIA to launch a completely digital and paperless service to support the request for new credit cards. This project uses authentication and digital signature systems to request a card in paperless mode. Moreover, Friday 23 December 2016 saw the completion of the acquisition by SIA of the processing activities of around 13.5 million payment cards and the management of 206,000 POS terminals and 12,000 ATM terminals in Italy, Germany and Austria from Unicredit Business Integrated Solutions (UBIS), a company in the Unicredit Group, for the sum of €500 million. Following this agreement, SIA S.p.A. on January 1, 2017, established two new companies: P4cards S.r.l., based in Verona, and Pforcards GmbH, based in Vienna, to manage the payment cards processing activities.

In the spring of 2017 the Central Bank of Iceland (CBI) has chosen SIA to implement and support the new real-time gross settlement system (RTGS) and the new instant payment platform. These technology infrastructures developed by SIA, planned to go live in 2018, will replace CBI's current mainframe-based real-time solutions for high and low-value payment systems, which have been operating since 2001. Central Bank of Iceland manages all interbank payments in the country. Despite the small population, it processes a quite significant daily volume of transactions: up to 1 million payments with a peak of 160,000 per hour.

In May, Thomson Reuters launched the “SIABookbuilding” application on its flagship desktop platform Eikon, offering sell-side professionals a new fully integrated application for the IPO syndication and distribution process. SIABookbuilding is available through App Studio, Eikon's third-party development platform.

A couple of weeks later, Poste Italiane and SIA have signed a deal that allows holders of debit cards and Postepay cards to use the Extra Sconti App, which is based on a cash-back mechanism to credit consumers' postal current accounts for supermarket purchases of brands recommended by the Extra Sconti App.

On July 27, SIA celebrated its first 40 years of existence.

On May 25, 2018, SIA and First Data Corporation have signed an agreement for SIA to acquire First Data's card processing businesses in parts of Central and Southeastern Europe for €375 million. In 2017, these businesses generated a combined revenue of approximately €100 million for First Data. This acquisition by SIA provides card processing, card production, call center and back-office services, including 13.3 million payment cards, 1.4 billion transactions, in addition to the management of POS terminals and ATMs. These businesses are primarily located in 7 countries: Greece, Croatia, Czech Republic, Hungary, Romania, Serbia and Slovakia.

On November 29, 2018, the Board of Directors of SIA, meeting under the chairmanship of Giuliano Asperti, appointed Nicola Cordone to the position of chief executive officer of the company, after having co-opted him as Director.

On 5 October 2020 it was announced SIA will merge with Nexi, will create one of Europe's largest fintech groups.

On December 16, 2021, Nexi signed the merger deed to create one of Europe's largest payment groups. The merger with SIA is effective as of Jan. 1, 2022.

== Business areas ==
- Payment systems: clearing and settlement of gross payments, management of interbank collections and payments (e.g. credit transfers, payment orders, direct debits, bank checks), contactless payments, mobile payments, multichannel payments, procurement supporting treasury processes, document management (electronic orders, e-billing and digital custody), reconciliation of accounting flows, payment terminal handling in the domestic and international market.
- Payment cards: issuing and acquiring of debit, credit and prepaid cards for all domestic and international circuits, fraud and dispute prevention and management.
- Services to financial markets: trading and post trading technology platforms for financial markets and their access systems, systems for market surveillance and for monitoring and transparency of trading.
- Management of databases: Interbank register of bad cheques and payment cards, CAB bank branch database, Bancomat card block service, ATM procedural register and monitoring service.
- Network: connectivity and data transport services to banks and financial firms, management of the Rete Nazionale Interbancaria (RNI – national interbank network) which links Banca d'Italia, datacenters of all financial institutions, capital markets, the Public Connectivity System, credit and debit card processors and the premises and sales outlets of businesses.

== Business data ==
In 2017, the SIA Group processed overall the clearing of 13.1 billion transactions (+7% compared to 2016), 6.1 billion card transactions (+41.1%) and 3.3 billion payment transactions (+7.1%) relating to credit transfers and collections. On the financial markets, the number of trading and post-trading transactions rose to 56.2 billion from 47.4 billion in 2016, an increase of 18.8%. SIA handled a volume of traffic of over 784 terabytes of data, up 19.8% compared to 2016, on the 174,000 km of the SIAnet network, with total infrastructure availability and 100% service levels.

== Main economic and financial results ==
2017 saw a rise in SIA's revenues of €403.4 million, with a growth of €12.6 million (+3.2%). EBITDA is down at €114.6 million from €118.6 million in 2016 (-3.4%) and operating results reached €88.5 million (-12.1%). Net profit is €63.4 million, down by €6.4 million (-9.1%) compared to the previous financial year. These results, as well as SIA's net financial position, were affected by the acquisition of the cards business unit from UBIS for a sum of €500 million.

== Shareholders as at 31 December 2017 ==
- FSIA Investimenti - 57.42%%
- CDP Equity (Cassa Depositi e Prestiti) - 25.69%
- Banco BPM - 5.33%
- Mediolanum S.p.A. - 2.85%
- Deutsche Bank S.p.A. - 2.58%
- Others - 6.13%

== SIA Group subsidiaries as at 1 January 2020 ==
- New SIA Greece Single Member S.A. - 100%
- Perago FSE L.t.d. - 100%
- PforCards GmbH - 100%
- P4cards S.r.l. - 100%
- SIAadvisor S.r.l. - 51%
- SIApay S.r.l.- 100%
- SIA Central Europe, a.s. - 100%
