= Maria Patrizia Grieco =

Italian businesswoman

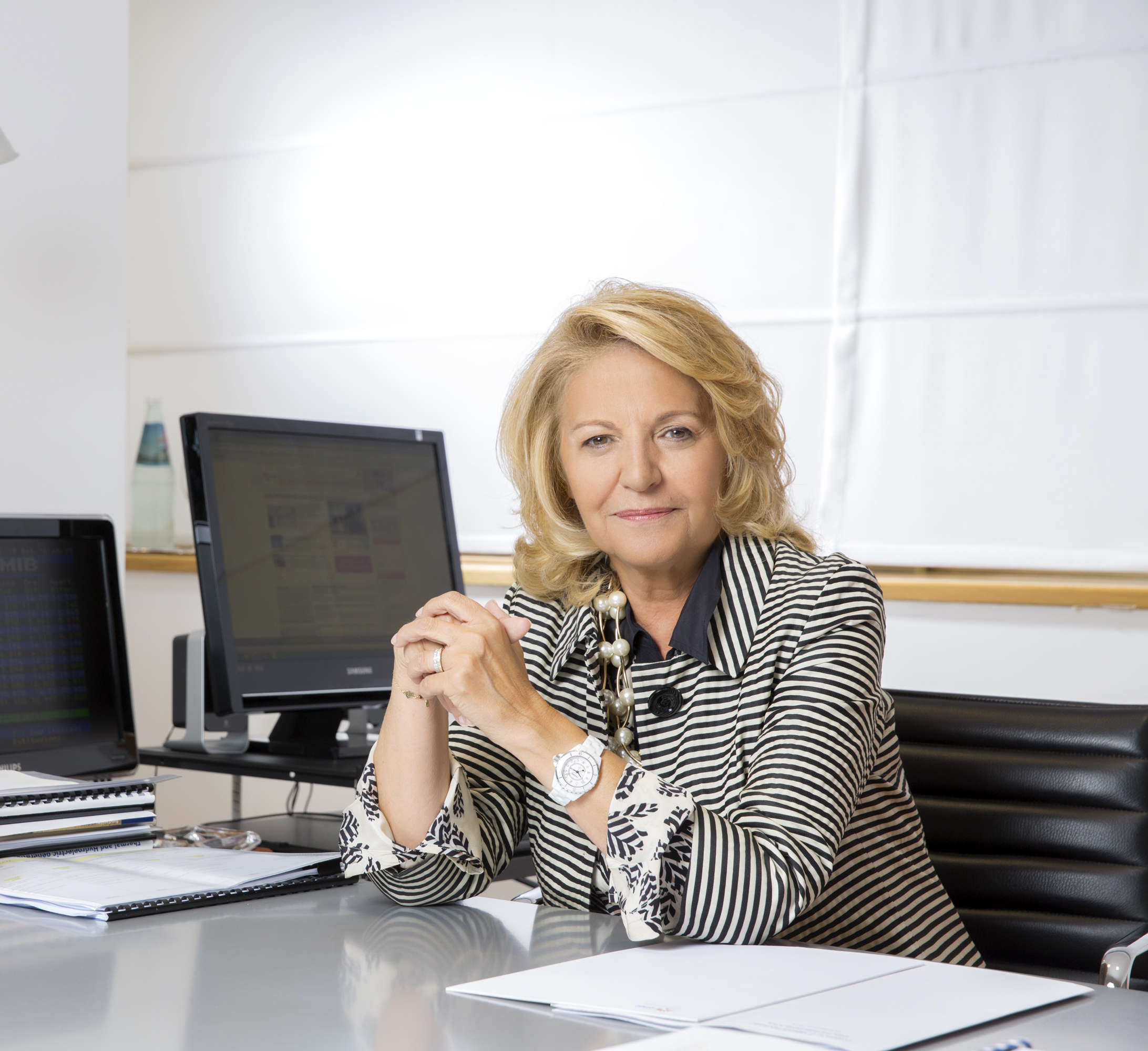
- Born: February 1, 1952 (age 74); Milan, Italy
- Occupations: Chairman of Enel, 2014-2020

Maria Patrizia Grieco (born February 1, 1952) is an Italian corporate executive. She was the chairman of Enel (2014-20), the director of Anima Holding and CNH Industrial, and a board member of Save the Children.

== Early life and education ==
Grieco graduated in Law at the University of Milan

== Career ==
Grieco began her career in 1977 in Italtel, where she was appointed director of legal and general affairs in 1994, director-general in 1999 and managing director in 2002.

Over the years she has held various managerial roles in a number of large companies, including:

- managing director at Siemens Informatica (2003–2006);
- managing director at Value Team, today NTT DATA (2006);
- managing director at Olivetti (2008–2013), then chairman (2011–2014);
- manager at Fiat Industrial (from 2012), today CNH Industrial;
- director at Anima Holding (from 2014);
- board member of Assonime (from 2014).

In May 2014, Grieco became chairperson of the board of Enel.

== Other activities ==
=== Corporate boards ===
- Endesa, Independent Member of the Board of Directors (since 2021)
- Amplifon, Non-Executive Independent Member of the Board of Directors (since 2021)

=== Non-profit organizations ===
- Bocconi University, Member of the Board (since 2019)
- Istituto Affari Internazionali (IAI), Member of the Board
- Trilateral Commission, Member (since 2015)
- Save the Children, Member of the Board (since 2010)
- Bellisario Prize, Member of the Honour Committee

== Awards ==
- In 2000, Grieco was awarded the Bellisario prize, a recognition for women who have distinguished themselves professionally, in management, science, or economics, nationally and internationally.

== Bibliography ==
- Monica D'Ascenzo. Fatti più in là. Donne al vertice delle aziende: le quote rosa nei cda. Gruppo 24 Ore. ISBN 9788863453539.
- Lella Golfo. Ad alta quota: Storia di una donna libera. Marsilio Editori. ISBN 9788831734639.
- Ilda Bartoloni (2001). Il nuovo potere delle donne. Sperling & Kupfer. ISBN 9788820031282.
- Who's who. Who's Who in Italy. 2006.
- "Patrizia Grieco a Value Partners". Il Mondo. 2006.
