= Banca Popolare di Sondrio =

Italian bank based in Sondrio, Lombardy

People's Bank of Sondrio
- Native name: Banca Popolare di Sondrio
- Company type: Listed cooperative
- Traded as: BIT: BPSO; FTSE MIB
- Industry: financial sector
- Founded: 1871
- Defunct: 20th April 2026
- Headquarters: Sondrio, Italy
- Area served: Northern Italy, Switzerland
- Revenue: $1.5 billion (2023)
- Net income: ▲$264.1 million (2023)
- Total assets: €55,866 billion (Q1 2025)
- Total equity: ▲€2,221,418,922 (2014)
- Capital ratio: 16.34% (CET1)
- Website: www.popso.it

Banca Popolare di Sondrio S.C.p.A. (BPSO) was an Italian bank based in Sondrio, Lombardy. The company was included in FTSE Italia Mid Cap Index. It has been designated as a Significant Institution since the entry into force of European Banking Supervision in late 2014, and as a consequence is directly supervised by the European Central Bank.

== History ==
Banca Popolare di Sondrio was an urban cooperative bank found in 1871. Along with Credito Valtellinese, they were the major banks inside the Province of Sondrio.

The bank also owned equity interests in several companies that provide services to the bank, such as Banca Italease (4.252% on 30 June 2009), Arca Vita and Istituto Centrale delle Banche Popolari Italiane (2%).

In 2009–11 Banca Italease was dismantled. BPSO acquired 20.95% stake in Alba Leasing as well as 60.5% stake in Factorit.

Due to Decree-Law N°3/2015, the bank would be demutualized. However, it was held due to an appeal to the court.

In September 2017 the bank announced that, they acquired Banca della Nuova Terra.

In September 2023, Unipol acquired 10.2% of Banca Popolare di Sondrio's shares, thus lifting its stake at 19.7 % of the capital of the bank.

In March 2024, the company launched a €200 million subordinated bond repurchase programme maturing on 30 July 2029.

On 7 February 2025, BPER Banca launched a €4.3bn takeover bid on Banca Popolare di Sondrio. By 11 July 2025, BPER Banca acquired a majority stake in Banca Popolare di Sondrio with of 58.49% of the shares, thus granting the Emilia-Romagnan lender the control of Banca Popolare di Sondrio. On 5 November 2025, the boards of BPER Banca and Banca Popolare di Sondrio approved the merger by absorption of Banca Popolare di Sondrio into BPER Banca, planned for April 2026. The merge was effectively completed on April 20th 2026.

== Equity interests ==
- ARCA SGR
