= Cassa di Risparmio di Imola =

Italian savings bank

CR Imola
- Native name: Cassa di Risparmio di Imola
- Type: Brand (former company)
- Founded: 1855; 1991 (S.p.A.); 2008 (brand)
- Headquarters: Imola, Italy

Cassa di Risparmio di Imola (CR Imola) was an Italian savings bank based in Imola, in the Province of Bologna, Emilia-Romagna. It currently a department and a brand of Banco Popolare.

== History ==
Cassa di Risparmio di Imola was found in 1855 in Imola, in the Papal States.

In 1992, due to Legge Amato, the statutory corporation was split into a private limited company and a banking foundation. Casse Emiliano Romagnole was introduced as a minority shareholders for 20% shares. In 1997 the foundation bought back the shares.

=== Banca Popolare di Lodi ===
In 2000, the bank had 29 branches. In the same year, CR Imola became part of Banca Popolare di Lodi (BPL) which owned 62.18% shares indirectly through Bipielle Partecipazioni, Istituto di Credito delle Casse di Risparmio Italiane, Efibanca and Holding Cassa di Risparmio di Imola as sub-holding companies. In 2001, BPL owned 96.95% shares (67.91% through Bipielle Partecipazioni and 29.04% directly). In 2002 CR Imola was merged with Banca Bipielle Romagna to form Banca Bipielle Adriatico. BPL owned 83.10% shares of the subsidiary through sub-holding Bipielle Retail. However, in 2003 the bank was absorbed into BPL. BPL was merged with BPVN to form Banco Popolare. A new subsidiary was incorporated to own part of the former assets of BPL.

=== Relaunch as brand ===
In 2008, BPL relaunched CR Imola as one of their brands. In 2011, after BPL was absorbed into the parent company, CR Imola became a department of bank division Banca Popolare di Verona instead since 2012.

== See also ==
- Cassa di Risparmio in Bologna
- Rolo Banca
- List of banks in Italy
