= WeBank (Italy) =

Italian online bank

Webank
- Industry: Banking
- Founded: 1999; 27 years ago
- Headquarters: Milan, Italy
- Products: Banking
- Number of employees: 174 (2009)
- Website: www.webank.it

Webank (Italy) is an Italian online bank.

== History ==
Managed for almost 10 years by We@Service, the internet services company for BPM Group, Webank became on 1 November 2009 an independent bank (WeBank S.p.A.) fully owned by Banca Popolare di Milano (BPM).

On 9 March 2010, the Board of Directors of Banca Popolare di Milano S.c.a r.l. approved the acquisition of IntesaTrade SIM, an online brokerage securities company, renamed WeTrade SIM.

On 23 September 2014, the Board of Directors of BPM and the Board of Directors of Webank S.p.A. approved the merger by incorporation of Webank into BPM, becoming on 23 November 2014 the internet channel for banking and investment services for BPM Group.

== Awards ==
- In 2019, it was awarded as Best Online Broker at the thirteenth edition of the Italian Certificate Awards
- In 2018, the German Institute of Quality and Finance rated the Webank loan as excellent
- In 2016, Webank's mobile application received a triple gold medal of the Mediastars award
