= Banca Popolare di Lecco =

Former Italian bank

Banca Popolare di Lecco (BPL) was a bank that operated in Lecco, in northern Lombardy in Italy between 1872 and 1993. It was founded in 1872 as the Società Cooperativa di Credito Banca Popolare, and eventually expanded to 20 branches. The idea was to create in Lecco a local credit institution that would be responsive to local conditions. Between 1873 and 1881 the Society faced great difficulties due to a serious local economic depression; of the 600 and more factories engaged in the silk trade, fewer than 100 survived. In 1912 two other local banks failed, but Banca Popolare survived and converted from a cooperative society to a corporation.

The bank benefited from the expansion of war production during World War I. Between 1919 and 1932 it opened numerous branches in the region and acquired Banca del Mandamento, which permitted it to expand its branch in Como. World War II again created a period of great difficulties, including the German occupation forces requisitioning of its headquarters from 1944 to 1945. After the war normality returned and the bank reorganized.

By 1947, it had 27 branches. By the time of its Centenary, it had 38, with two headquarters, Milan and Como. Between 1988 and 1993, Banca Popolare di Novara (BPN) acquired a substantial stake in Banca Popolare di Lecco and seats on the board of directors. In November 1993, BPN sold its shares to Bank of America and Italy, which had become a subsidiary of Deutsche Bank in 1986. BPL lost its separate identity in 1994.

== See also ==
- List of banks in Italy
