= Banca Popolare di Crema =

Banca Popolare di Crema is an Italian banking brand and former subsidiary of Banco Popolare.

== History ==
Founded as Banca Popolare Agricola di Mutuo Credito in 1870, the Crema-based bank was later known as Banca Popolare di Crema. It became a subsidiary of Banca Popolare di Lodi (via sub-holding Reti Bancarie from 2003 to 2006) and then as a subsidiary of Banco Popolare since 2007. In 2011, Banca Popolare di Crema was absorbed by Banco Popolare, but retained as a brand, under banking division Banca Popolare di Lodi.

As at 31 December 2010, BP Crema had a shareholders' equity of €214.819 million.

== See also ==
- List of banks in Italy
