= Reti Bancarie =

Reti Bancarie S.p.A
- Company type: Società per azioni Holding company
- Founded: 2003
- Defunct: 2006
- Fate: Acquired
- Headquarters: Lucca, Italy
- Owner: Banca Popolare di Lodi
- Parent: Banca Popolare di Lodi
- Website: www.retibancarie.it

Reti Bancarie was an intermediate holding company of Banca Popolare di Lodi Group (aka Bipielle; BPL). BPL's subsidiary reverse takeover listed company Banco di Chiavari e della Riviera Ligure in 2003. in 2006 it was absorbed into BPL.

== History ==
On 21 January 2003 BPL acquired the controlling interests (69.62% or 48,735,000 of 70 million shares) of Banco di Chiavari e della Riviera Ligure (BCRL) from Banca Intesa for €405 million, as well as absorbed their banking activities. BPL offered €7 per shares of BCRL to other shareholders. On 30 June 2003 BPL's sub-holding company Bipielle Retail (which BPL owned 55.46% plus an additional 34.45% through Bipielle Investimenti), owned 87.26% shares of BCRL. In the same year BCRL reversed merger with Bipielle Retail, effectively listed the retail banks in Borsa Italiana. The registered office of the company also relocated to Lucca, Tuscany, as Reti Bancarie Holding S.p.A.. The company held the following retail banks: Banca Popolare di Crema (95.01%), Banca Popolare di Cremona (94.81%), Banca Popolare di Mantova (56.35%), Banca Valori (77.70%), Bipielle Società di Gestione del Credito (70% directly; 30% held by CR Lucca), Bipielle International Holding (90%; including Bipielle Bank (Suisse), Bipielle International UK and Bipielle Servizi), Cassa di Risparmio di Lucca (56.99%; including CR Livorno and CR Pisa) and Banca Caripe (51%). At the end of 2003 financial year the company had a shareholders equity of €1.316 billion compare to €216 million as BCRL. After the reversed merger, BPL owned 79.23% shares of Reti Bancarie as at 31 December 1993. The company also reduced its share capitals from €36.4 million to about €17 million, or a net reduction of 37,352,597 shares (from 70 million to 32,647,403).

In May 2004 the company issued new shares in order to raise capitals to privatize the retail subsidiaries. Eventually 15,975,818 new shares (from 32,647,403 to 48,623,221) was issued for €40 each, which made the company recapitalized €639 million. BPL's ownership was diluted to 66.90% as at 31 December 2004. Unipol Assicurazioni, through subsidiary Aurora Assicurazioni, owned 5.79% shares (2,816,000), which purchased from BPL for €173.4 million. The insurance company also had rights to sell their product in the retail banks of Reti Bancarie exclusively for 5-year. Fondazione Cassa di Risparmio di Lucca owned 1.029% shares (500,550 for €20 million) as at 31 December 2004. The bank foundation also signed an agreement with BPL in July 2004, that the investment had a minimum return rate of Euribor 6 months + 0.40%, as well as BPL would bought back the shares. In 2005 the foundation exchanged their shares with BPL to buy back 9,216,581 shares of CR Lucca, as well as contribute to the recapitalization of CR Lucca, making Reti Bancarie owned 46.28% shares of CR Lucca only. However, the foundation also signed a put option with BPL which the foundation would sell all the shares of CR Lucca.

In 2006 BPL absorbed intermediate holding companies Reti Bancarie and Bipielle Investimenti. Each shares of Reti Bancarie was exchanged with 5 shares of BPL. Aurora Assicurazioni sold their possession to Mediobanca.
