= Banco di Chiavari e della Riviera Ligure =

Italian regional bank based in Liguria

- Formerly: Banco di Sconto del Circondario di Chiavari
- Company type: brand; (former S.p.A. and subsidiary)
- Industry: Financial services
- Founded: 1870; 2008 (brand)
- Defunct: 2003–08
- Fate: absorbed by BPL in 2003; reestablished as a brand in 2008
- Successor: Reti Bancarie
- Headquarters: Chiavari, Italy
- Services: Retail banking
- Owner: Banco Popolare

Banco di Chiavari e della Riviera Ligure (BCRL) was an Italian regional bank based in Chiavari, Liguria. it was acquired and absorbed into Banca Popolare di Lodi in 2003. Currently it is a division and a brand of Banco Popolare.

== History ==
The bank was found in 1870 as Banco di Sconto del Circondario di Chiavari. In 1968 it was acquired by Banca Commerciale Italiana (BCI). In 1999 BCRL became part of Banca Intesa Group. That year Intesa acquired 70% shares of BCI, which owned 69.62% shares of BCRL. In 2001 Intesa held all the shares previously owned by BCI. On 21 January 2003 BCRL was sold to Bipielle Group. Bipielle acquired all the bank activity of the company and renaming the company into Reti Bancarie, which de facto making the company publicly float the retail banking subsidiaries of the group in Borsa Italiana.

In 2008 BPL relaunched the brand as the name of the branches in Liguria region. After BPL was absorbed into the parent company, BCRL was a department of bank division BPL instead.

== See also ==
- List of banks in Italy
