= Banco Popolare =

Italian bank

Banco Popolare Società Cooperativa

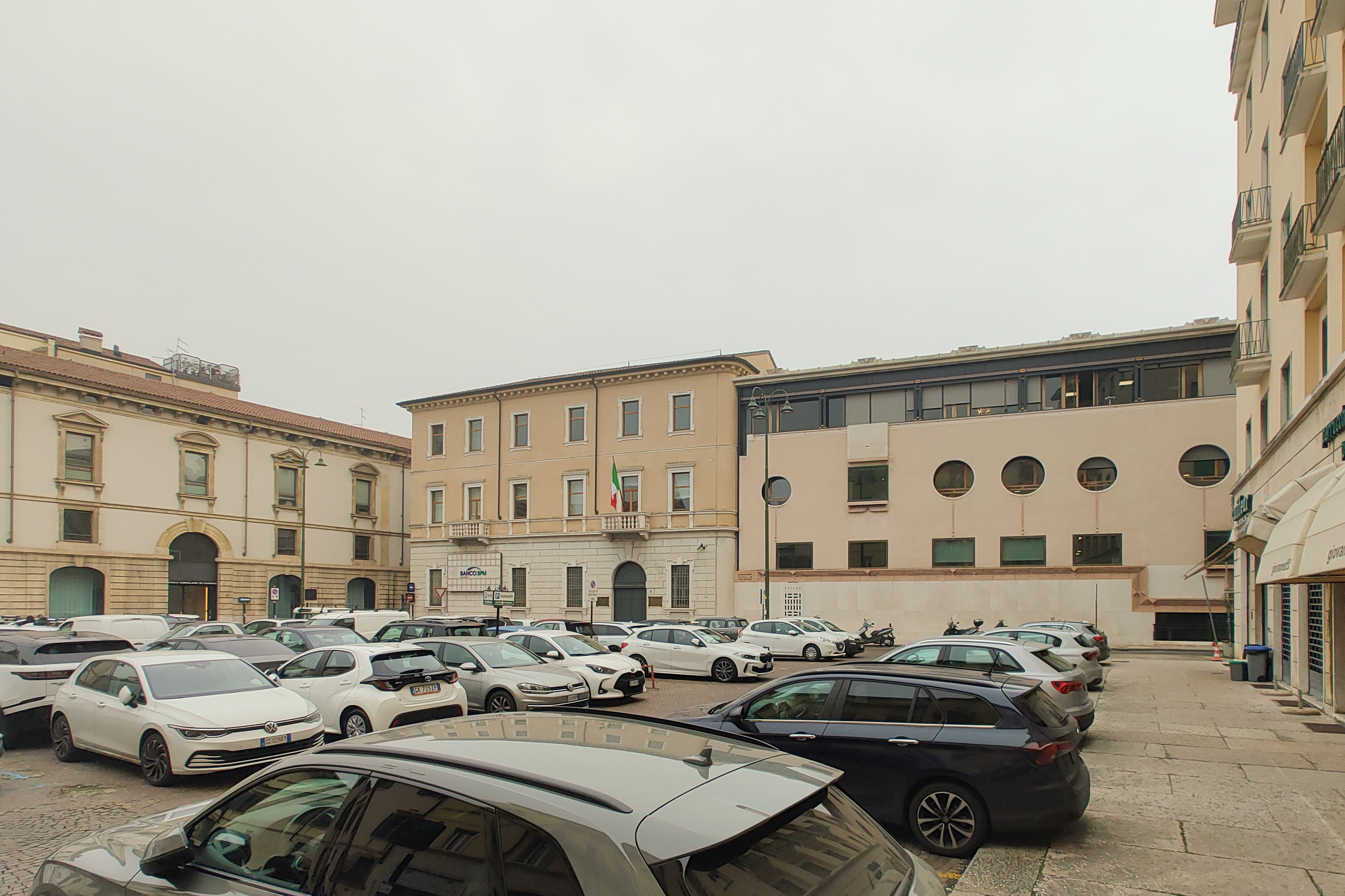
- Head office in Verona
- Native name: Banco Popolare Società Cooperativa
- Company type: Public
- Traded as: BIT: BP
- ISIN: IT0005002883
- Industry: Financial services
- Predecessor: Banco Popolare di Verona e Novara; Banca Popolare Italiana
- Founded: 1 June 2002 (BPVN); 1 July 2007 (Banco Popolare)
- Defunct: December 31, 2016
- Fate: merged with Banca Popolare di Milano
- Successor: Banco BPM
- Headquarters: Verona, Italy
Number of locations
▼1,848 branches	(2015)
▼1,731 branches	(2016)
- Area served: Italy (except Abruzzo), Hong Kong, Shanghai, Mumbai and Moscow
- Key people: Carlo Fratta Pasini (chairman); Pier Francesco Saviotti (CEO)
- Products: Retail banking; Corporate banking; Investment banking; Private banking; Leasing & factoring; Asset management; Insurance (via JV)
- Brands: Brands: Banca Popolare di Verona; Banco S.Geminiano e S.Prospero; Banco San Marco; Banca Popolare di Trentino; Cassa di Risparmio di Imola; Banca Popolare di Novara; Banco Popolare Siciliano; Credito Bergamasco; Banca Popolare di Lodi; Cassa di Risparmio di Lucca Pisa Livorno; Banco di Chiavari e della Riviera Ligure; Banca Popolare di Cremona; Banca Popolare di Crema
Net income
▲€430 million	(2015 restated)
▼ (€1.682 billion)	(2016)
Total assets
▼€120.161 billion	(2015 restated)
▼€117.411 billion	(2016)
Total equity
▲€8.494 billion	(2015 restated)
▼€7.575 billion	(2016)
Number of employees
▼16,972	(2015)
▼16,626	(2016)
- Subsidiaries: Popolare Vita (50%-50% JV); Avipop Assicurazioni (50%-50% JV); Avipop Vita (50%-50% JV); Banca Aletti
Capital ratio
13.15%	(Group CET1, 31 December 2015)
12.97%	(Group CET1, 31 December 2016)
- Website: gruppobancopopolare.it
- Footnotes / references in consolidated financial statement

Banco Popolare Società Cooperativa was an Italian bank, formed in 2007 from the merger of Banco Popolare di Verona e Novara (BPVN) and Banca Popolare Italiana (BPI). The bank merged with Banca Popolare di Milano on 1 January 2017. to form Banco BPM.

The bank was ranked fourth by total assets (among retail and commercial banks), according to Ricerche e Studi using 2015 data. The bank was a cooperative partnership. However, Italian Law N°3/2015 required all Popular Banks (Banca Popolare) with total assets above €8 billion, to transform into società per azioni (company limited by shares). In 2016 it was announced that the bank would be merged with Banca Popolare di Milano. At the same time the new bank would be registered as S.p.A.

Banco Popolare was a component of FTSE MIB index of Borsa Italiana (Italian stock exchange).

The group had branches in 19 out of 20 regions of Italy, except in Abruzzo (the subsidiary Banca Caripe was sold in 2011). Moreover, the bank was absent in several provinces of Italy, such as South Tyrol (the equity investment in Südtiroler Sparkasse was sold in 2007), and the province of Sondrio, Lombardy. Moreover, the bank only presented in one out of eight provinces of Sardinia and one out of five provinces of Calabria (only in Reggio Calabria).

== History ==
BPVN logo

=== Banco Popolare di Verona e Novara ===
Banco Popolare di Verona e Novara, Società Cooperativa a responsabilità limitata (known as just Banco Popolare; P.I. 0323127 023 6) was formed in 2002 by the merger of Banco Popolare di Verona – S.Geminiano e S.Prospero and Banca Popolare di Novara.

From 2002 to 2004 the group made multiple deals with insurer Cattolica Assicurazioni on Credito Bergamasco and other joint ventures. The partnership with the insurer ended in 2007, which after the merger with BPI, the new banking group changed to partner with Fondiaria-Sai in bancassurance (Popolare Vita, ex-BPV Vita).

=== Banco Popolare ===
Banco Popolare Società Cooperativa (P.I. 0370043 023 8) was formed by the merger of Banco Popolare di Verona e Novara (BPVN) and Banca Popolare Italiana (BPI). After the deal a new holding company was formed, with Banco Popolare di Verona – S.Geminiano e S.Prospero, Banca Popolare di Novara, Banca Popolare di Lodi, Credito Bergamasco and Cassa di Risparmio di Lucca Pisa Livorno were the main subsidiaries.

64% of the shareholders of the new bank were former shareholders of BPVN, with the rest being the former holders of BPI. Banco Popolare also sold Banca Popolare di Mantova to Banca Popolare di Milano in 2008.

In June 2009, the company became the first Italian bank to receive state aid from the Government of Italy due to the 2008 financial crisis. It sold €1.5 billion in convertible bonds to the state.

On 1 January 2011 the group sold Banca Caripe to Banca Tercas, the bank only section in Abruzzo. In the same year most of the subsidiaries were absorbed into the parent companies, but remained as a brand and as internal bank divisions and departments. The incorporation of Credito Bergamasco was completed in 2014. In 2015 Banca Italease was absorbed. It became the leasing division of the bank.

In 2015 the equity stake in ARCA SGR was sold to Banca Popolare dell'Emilia Romagna and Banca Popolare di Sondrio for €95.5 million.

In 2016 it was announced that the bank would be merged with Banca Popolare di Milano. The new bank would be ranked as the joint-third among the retail and commercial banks of Italy (both the proposed new bank and Banca Monte dei Paschi di Siena had total assets of around €170 billion according to 2015 data). The bank also claimed that the new bank would be ranked as the third in terms of branches (above 8%) and more specifically the first in Lombardy (above 15.5% where BPMilano, BPMantova and BPL were located), the third in Veneto (above 9.5% where BPV was located) and the third in Piedmont (above 12.5% where BPN was located). As part of the deal Banco Popolare would also recapitalize €1 billion in order to increase its capital quality. Both banks had below 1 P/B ratio (which Banco Popolare had a higher discount), making the share capital of the new bank roughly composed of 54% shareholders of Banco Popolare and 46% BPM.

As part of the merger and demutualization, Banco Popolare had set an exit price of €3.156 per share for shareholders who did not vote or against the merger in the extraordinary shareholders' meeting in October 2016, which was calculated by the mean of the share price of the previous six months, although it was still above the market price at that time.
