= Banca Popolare di Milano =

Italian bank

Banca Popolare di Milano S.p.A.

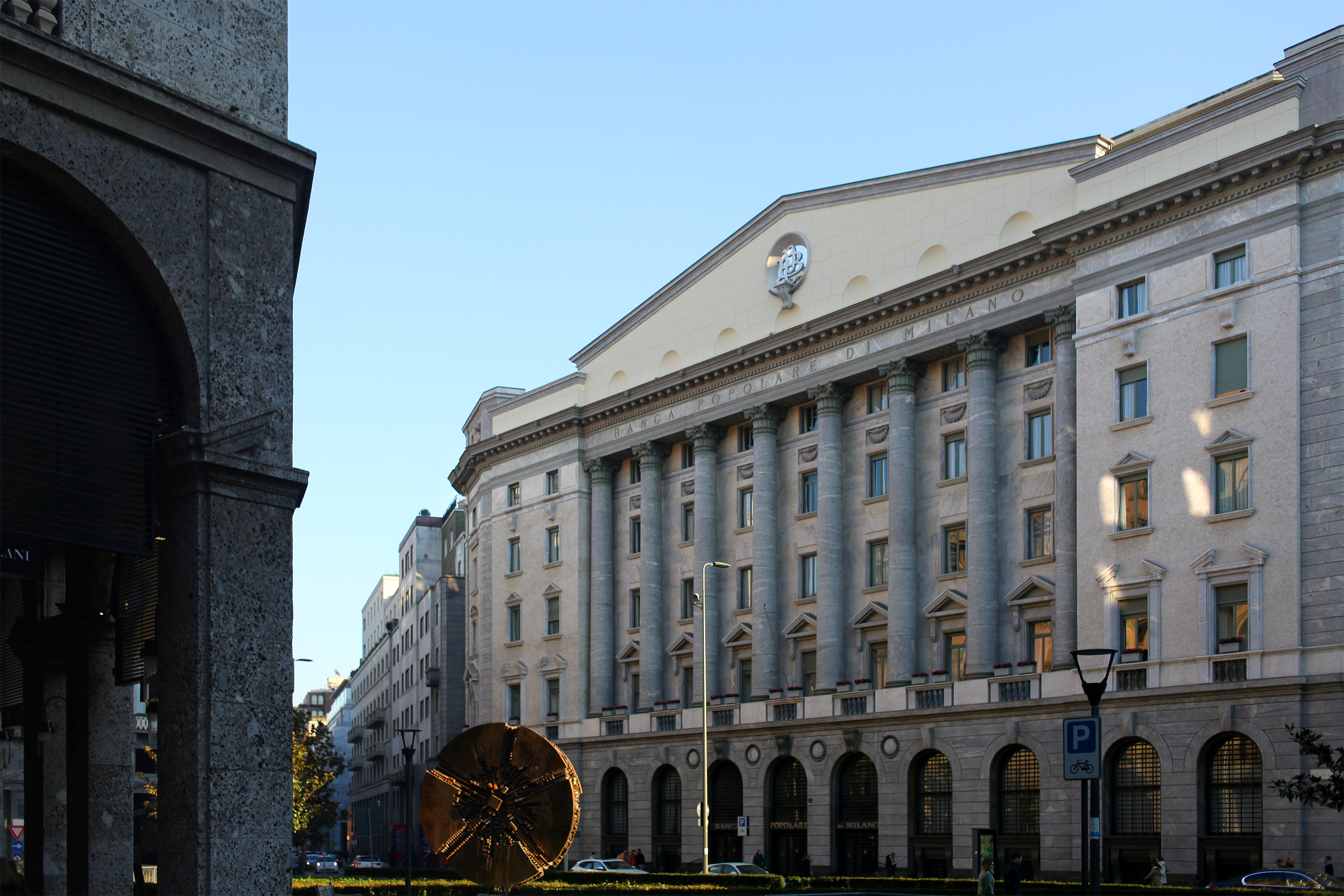
- Head office in Milan
- Formerly: Banca Popolare di Milano S.c. a r.l.
- Company type: Subsidiary
- Industry: Financial services
- Founded: 1865; 161 years ago
- Headquarters: Milan, Italy
- Number of locations: ▼604 branches (2017)
- Key people: Umberto Ambrosoli; (chairman); Giuseppe Castagna; (CEO)
- Services: Retail banking; Investment banking; Private banking
- Parent: Banco BPM
- Divisions: WeBank
- Subsidiaries: Banca Akros; ProFamily
- Website: www.bpm.it

Banca Popolare di Milano S.p.A. also known as Bipiemme or just BPM is an Italian bank based in Milan, Lombardy. The bank is a wholly owned subsidiary of Banco BPM. Banca Popolare di Milano S.c. a r.l., an urban area cooperative bank, was founded in 1865, however, due to the merger and the foundation of Banco BPM, the original branches of BPM as well as some businesses were injected into another legal person and BPM's subsidiary Banca Popolare di Mantova, which was renamed to Banca Popolare di Milano S.p.A. on 1 January 2017.

Before the merger, BPM was a listed company on the Borsa Italiana (Milan Stock Exchange); after the merger, only the parent company Banco BPM is a listed company.

As of 31 December 2016, before the merger, the bank had 656 branches, including private banking and corporate banking centres; about 61% of the branches of BPM were from Lombardy (390); the group also had branches in Emilia-Romagna (28), Lazio (65), Apulia (36), Piedmont (87), Liguria (11), Veneto (7), Tuscany (5), Campania (2), Marche (1), Molise (1), Abruzzo (1) and Friuli– Venezia Giulia (1).

After the merger, as of 31 December 2017, Banca Popolare di Milano, excluding Banca Akros, had 604 branches.

== History ==
The second cooperative bank in Italy (the first one was the Banca Popolare di Lodi), was founded in 1865 in Milan by Luigi Luzzatti, who later served as the nation's Prime Minister. Luzzatti drew his inspiration from the 'credit associations' developed by Hermann Schulze-Delitzsch in Germany a decade earlier.

BPM has grown considerably since the 1950s by buying interests in other banks such as Banca Popolare di Roma (1924–1957), la Banca Briantea, Banca Agricola Milanese, Banca Popolare Cooperativa Vogherese, Banca Popolare di Bologna e Ferrara, Banca Popolare di Apricena, INA Banca, Cassa di Risparmio di Alessandria, Banca di Legnano and Banca Popolare di Mantova.

In 1999 Banca Popolare di Milano opened an online banking service called WeBank.

BPM was the minority owner of Cassa di Risparmio di Asti and Crediop.

On February 25, 2010, BPM announced the acquisition from Banco Popolare of 30% of Factorit spa for 51 million euros. Factorit is a factoring company that operates in the field of the advance and collection of trade receivables and related services, and is also owned by Banca Popolare di Sondrio (60.5%).

The board of directors of 23 March 2010 approved the sale of the custodian bank activity to Bnp Paribas, generating a capital gain of approximately €50 million.

With the emergence of the economic crisis in Greece, a few days after the downgrading of Greek government bonds by the main rating agencies, on 11 May 2010 BPM announced that its exposure to securities of "PIGS countries" is less than 22 million euros.

On 18 June 2010, the Bank of Italy authorized BPM to buy back from Fondiaria Sai, for 113 million euros, the 51% stake held by Milano Assicurazioni in Bipiemme Vita.

After the go-ahead from the Bank of Italy in November 2009, on 25 June 2010 BPM formally inaugurated ProFamily, a new company specializing in consumer credit.

On 20 July 2010, BPM announced that it had entered into an alliance agreement with Monte dei Paschi di Siena and Clessidra Sgr to combine Anima Sgr with Prima Sgr and set up a new independent operator in asset management. The resulting entity is Anima Holding.

=== As a subsidiary of Banco BPM ===
On 15 October 2016, the merger between Banca Popolare di Milano (BPM) and Banco Popolare was approved by the extraordinary shareholders meetings of the two banks. As part of the merger, the branch of Banca Popolare di Milano would be kept as a subsidiary by injecting the business into BPM's subsidiary Banca Popolare di Mantova and renamed into Banca Popolare di Milano S.p.A., which the new bank would be a subsidiary of Banco BPM.

The shareholders of Banco BPM would be composed of former shareholders of Banco Popolare and BPM in a proposed ratio of 54.626–45.374%. After the capital increase of Banco Popolare in mid-2016, the final exchange ratio would be 1 share of Banco Popolare to 1 share of Banco BPM, as well as 6.386 share of Banca Popolare di Milano to 1 share of Banco BPM.

Banca Popolare di Milano also offered to repurchase the shares if the shareholders against the merger or absent from the extraordinary shareholders meeting, for a price of €0.4918. Eventually BPM bought back 178,936,966 shares, or €88,001,199.88, equivalent to 4.07% of the total number of shares.
