= Banca Popolare di Lodi =

- Company type: Brand (former subsidiary)
- Industry: Financial services
- Founded: 1864
- Headquarters: Lodi, Italy
- Services: Retail banking
- Owner: Banco Popolare (100%)
- Parent: Banco Popolare
- Website: Official website (in Italian)

Banca Popolare di Lodi was an Italian cooperative bank based in Lodi, Lombardy. The bank was absorbed into parent company Banco Popolare in 2011. However, the bank still operates as a division and a brand of the group.

== History ==
Banca Popolare di Lodi was found in 1864. In the 1990s it became Banca Popolare di Lodi S.c.r.l., also known as Bipielle Group (sound likes BPL).

=== Alliances ===
The bank was a member of an alliance ARCA, which consists of Banca Antoniana, Banca Popolare Commercio e Industria, Banca Popolare di Crema, Banca Popolare di Cremona, Banca Popolare di Lodi and Banca Popolare Veneta. ARCA joined with "North East Group", which consists of Banca Agricola Mantovana, Banca Popolare di Bergamo, Banca Popolare dell'Emilia, Banca Popolare di Sondrio, Banca Popolare di Verona and Banca Popolare Vicentina in 1989.

BPL eventually acquired two of the banks of ARCA: BP Crema and Cremona; while Banca Popolare Veneta and Banca Antoniana merged to form Banca Antonveneta.

=== Acquisitions ===
The bank acquired bank as its subsidiaries, such as Credito Molisano in 1998, Cassa di Risparmio di Lucca, Pisa and Livorno in 1999, Imola in 2000, Banco di Chiavari e della Riviera Ligure in 2003 and Istituto di Credito delle Casse di Risparmio Italiane. BPL owned 19.99% of Südtiroler Sparkasse – Cassa di Risparmio di Bolzano until 2006–07. BPL was the major shareholders of Banca Caripe from 2003 to 2011. From 2003 to 2006 the sub-holding Reti Bancarie was a list company, which also held the shares of Banca Popolare di Crema (95.01%), Banca Popolare di Cremona (94.81%), Banca Popolare di Mantova (56.35%), Banca Valori (77.70%), Bipielle Società di Gestione del Credito (70% directly; 30% held by CR Lucca), Bipielle International Holding (90%; including Bipielle Bank (Suisse), Bipielle International UK and Bipielle Servizi) in 2003. In 2005 the company was named as Banca Popolare Italiana.

Reti Bancarie formed a 5-year partnership with Aurora Assicurazioni of Unipol Group in May 2004, as well as the insurance company bought minority ownership in Reti Bancarie.

The bank was also involved in the Bancopoli scandal, in which the bank sold the shares of Banca Antonveneta held by it in 2006.

On 31 December 2006 the bank had a shareholders equity of €3.956 billion (in consolidated balance sheets, increased from €2.786 billion), issued 682,360,539 number of shares, as well as Tier 1 capitals ratio of 22.32% (increased from 5.55%; Basel II required 4%).

In September 2006 BPL also absorbed sub-holding companies Reti Bancarie and Bipielle Investimenti, by issuing new shares of BPL and delisting them. Aurora Assicurazioni received 14,080,000 shares (about 2% of BPL); Unipol formed an agreement to sell the shares to Mediobanca.

=== As a subsidiary of Banco Popolare ===
In 2007 Banca Popolare Italiana merged with Banco Popolare di Verona e Novara to form Banco Popolare S.C. The bank was retained as a sub-holding company as Banca Popolare di Lodi S.p.A.. The bank also swapped branches with sister companies Banca Popolare di Novara and Banca Popolare di Verona – S.Geminiano e S.Prospero, in order to specialize in Lombardy (part), Romagna and Sicily. CR Lucca also sold to the parent company, with BP Crema, BP Cremona and Liberty S.r.l. retained as BPL subsidiaries only. While BP Mantova was sold in 2008 and Banca Caripe on 1 January 2011.

In 2008, the BPL relaunched CR Imola and Banco di Chiavari e della Riviera Ligure as their brands.

On 31 December 2010 BPL had a shareholders equity (in separate balance sheets?) of €1.439 billion (increased from €1.432 billion).

=== As a brand of Banco Popolare ===
In 2011 the company was absorbed into Banco Popolare. However, it was retained as a division of the bank, which included the CR Lucca sub-division, which covers Lodi and the former area belongs to Banco di Chiavari e della Riviera Ligure, Banca Popolare di Cremona and Banca Popolare di Crema. However, former branches in Sicily were managed by Banco Popolare Siciliano, a department of bank division BPN instead.

== See also ==
- List of banks in Italy
