= Banca Popolare di Novara =

- Type: Division
- Industry: Financial services
- Founded: 1871; 155 years ago; 2002 (as a subsidiary); 2011 (as a division)
- Headquarters: Novara, Italy
- Services: Retail and corporate banking
- Parent: Banco BPM

Banca Popolare di Novara was an Italian cooperative bank based in Novara, Piedmont. The bank was absorbed into parent company Banco Popolare in 2011 (Banco Popolare itself was merged in 2017 to form Banco BPM). However, the former company still operates as a division and a brand of the group.

== History ==
Banca Popolare di Novara Società Cooperativa a Responsabilità Limitata was founded in 1871. The bank was a minority shareholder of Mediocredito Piemontese, which was sold to UniCredit in 2001.

As at 31 December 2001, BPN had a total assets of €20,205,897,672, a net equity of €1,627,729,000 in the separate balance sheets.

In 2001 the bank was ranked the 18th by deposits (€14,743,042,000), compared to the 13th by Banca Popolare di Verona – SGSP (€20,394,760,000).

=== BPVN era ===
In 2002 BPN was merged with Banca Popolare di Verona – Banco S. Geminiano e S. Prospero S.c.a r.l. (BPV–SGSP), The former BPN shareholders became the shareholders of a new company Banco Popolare di Verona e Novara S.c.a r.l. (BPVN; P.IVA 03231270236); the original bank network of BPN was re-incorporated as a new subsidiary as Banca Popolare di Novara S.p.A. (from cooperative limited partnership to company limited by shares; P.IVA 01848410039)

=== Banco Popolare era ===
In 2007 BPVN was merged with Banca Popolare di Lodi S.c.a r.l.. Banco Popolare S.C. became the holding company instead. In 2008 the group remapped its branch network, which BPN was specialized in Piedmont, Apulia, Campania, Basilicata and Molise instead.

In 2011 the company was absorbed into Banco Popolare. However it retained as a division of the bank, which included Banco Popolare Siciliano which was transferred from BPL division, as well as Central-South Italy sub-division.

== Sponsorship ==
The bank was a sponsor of Novara Calcio.

== See also ==
- List of banks in Italy
