= Banca Popolare di Verona =

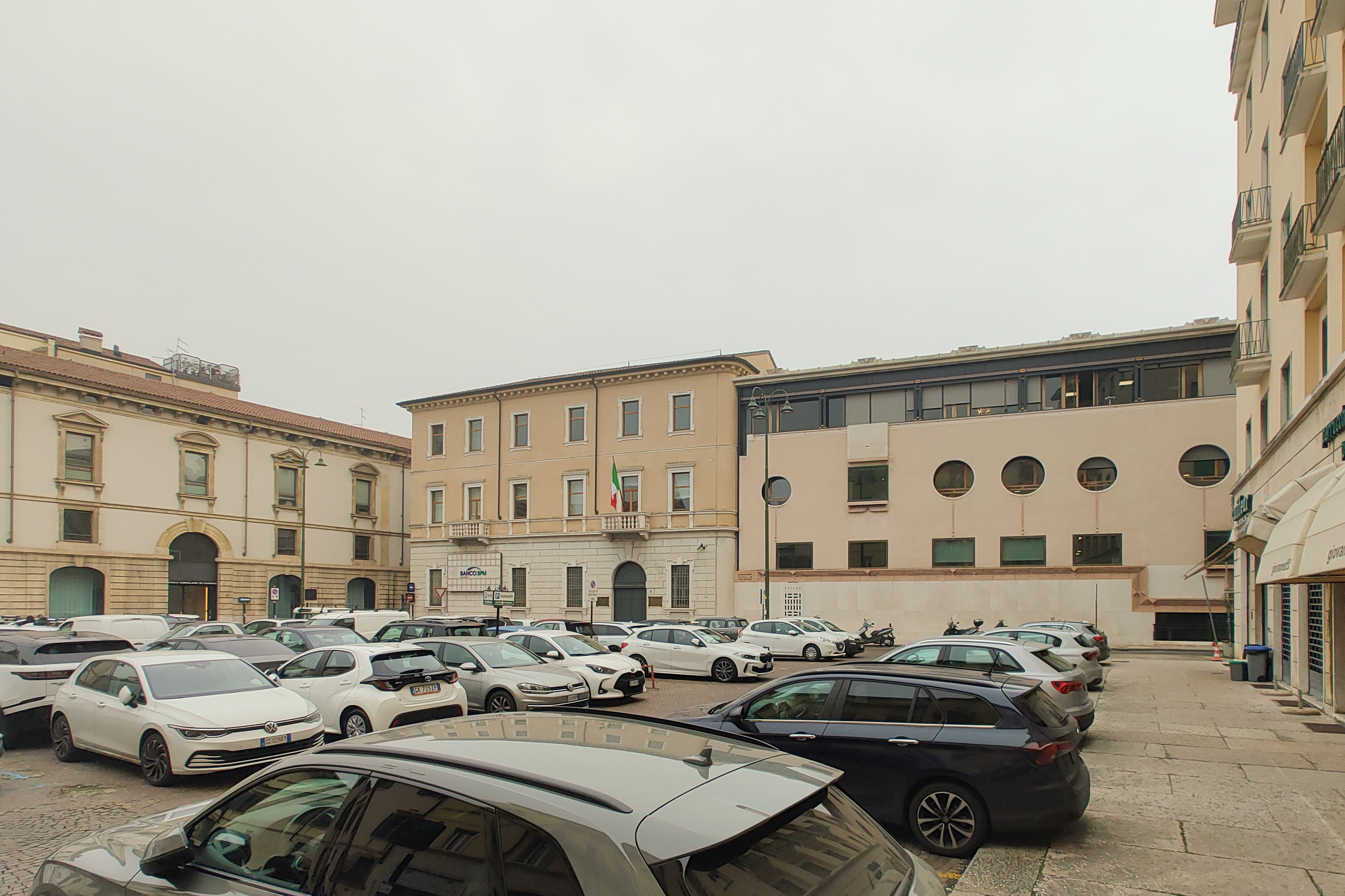
- Head office at Palazzo Scarpa, Verona
- Company type: Brand
- Industry: Bank
- Founded: 1867; 159 years ago
- Headquarters: Verona, Italy
- Parent: Banco Popolare
- Website: www.bpv.it

The Banca Popolare di Verona was an Italian bank which became part of the Banco Popolare Group, based in Verona, North Italy. Currently it is a brand of Banco Popolare.

== History ==
The original name of "Banca Popolare di Verona" was Banca Mutua Popolare di Verona, founded on 21 June 1867. It was the seventh Italian "People's" bank to be founded. (The meaning of "people's" is that every shareholder who has more than 150 shares can vote during the shareholders' meeting.)

=== BPV–SGSP ===
It was the first Italian bank that acquired another Italian bank (Banco S.Geminiano e S.Prospero di Modena) by a public takeover in 1993 and the name of the bank changed to Banca Popolare di Verona – Banco S. Geminiano e S. Prospero S.c.r.l. (ISIN: IT0001065215).

In 1997 the bank acquired Credito Bergamasco.

As at 31 December 2001, BPV–SGSP had a total assets of €30,588,789,000 in consolidated basis (€22,196,829,805 in separate basis)

In 2001 the bank was ranked the 13th by deposits (€20,394,760,000), compared to the 18th by Banca Popolare di Novara (€14,743,042,000), according to Mediobanca.

=== BPVN ===
On 1 June 2002 Banca Popolare di Verona – SGSP merged with Banca Popolare di Novara S.c.r.l. to form Banco Popolare di Verona e Novara. (ISIN: IT0003262513 / BPVN) A new subsidiary Banca Popolare di Novara S.p.A. was also formed. However, the former business belongs to BPV, which was only became divisions of BPVN. (expect insurance company BPV Vita and investment holding company Holding di Partecipazioni Finanziarie Banca Popolare di Verona – S. Geminiano e S. Prospero were retained as subsidiaries)

As at 31 December 2006, BPVN Group had a total assets of €68,694,935,000 and a shareholders' equity of €4,872,018,000 in consolidated balance sheets.

After another merger in 2007. BPV was reestablished as a subsidiary of the group.

=== BPV (subsidiary) ===
In 2007 Banco Popolare di Verona e Novara merged with Banca Popolare Italiana, forming banking group Banco Popolare. Division BPV also re-incorporated as Banca Popolare di Verona – S.Geminiano e S.Prospero S.p.A. until 2011. In 2011 the company was re-absorbed by the parent company, but remained as a brand and a division of the group. BPV division also managed Banco S.Geminiano e S.Prospero (as sub-division and brand), Banca San Marco (brand), Banca Popolare di Trentino (brand) and Cassa di Risparmio di Imola (brand).

== Sponsorship ==
Banca Popolare di Verona is a sponsor of Veronese football team A.C. Chievo Verona. The bank was the shirt sponsor. In the 2014–15 season the bank was credited as "top-sponsor" instead.

== See also ==
- List of banks in Italy
